

337001–337100 

|-bgcolor=#d6d6d6
| 337001 ||  || — || January 13, 2005 || Kitt Peak || Spacewatch || — || align=right | 3.9 km || 
|-id=002 bgcolor=#fefefe
| 337002 Robertbodzon || 2012 OB ||  || October 25, 2005 || Kitt Peak || Spacewatch || — || align=right | 1.2 km || 
|-id=003 bgcolor=#E9E9E9
| 337003 || 2012 OG || — || October 15, 2004 || Mount Lemmon || Mount Lemmon Survey || PAD || align=right | 1.4 km || 
|-id=004 bgcolor=#d6d6d6
| 337004 || 6507 P-L || — || September 24, 1960 || Palomar || PLS || — || align=right | 3.0 km || 
|-id=005 bgcolor=#fefefe
| 337005 || 2096 T-2 || — || September 29, 1973 || Palomar || PLS || — || align=right data-sort-value="0.75" | 750 m || 
|-id=006 bgcolor=#fefefe
| 337006 || 1062 T-3 || — || October 17, 1977 || Palomar || PLS || V || align=right | 1.1 km || 
|-id=007 bgcolor=#fefefe
| 337007 || 2145 T-3 || — || October 16, 1977 || Palomar || PLS || — || align=right data-sort-value="0.83" | 830 m || 
|-id=008 bgcolor=#fefefe
| 337008 || 2348 T-3 || — || October 16, 1977 || Palomar || PLS || FLO || align=right data-sort-value="0.76" | 760 m || 
|-id=009 bgcolor=#E9E9E9
| 337009 ||  || — || August 15, 1993 || Kitt Peak || Spacewatch || — || align=right | 3.2 km || 
|-id=010 bgcolor=#fefefe
| 337010 ||  || — || October 9, 1993 || La Silla || E. W. Elst || — || align=right | 1.3 km || 
|-id=011 bgcolor=#fefefe
| 337011 ||  || — || November 8, 1993 || Kitt Peak || Spacewatch || H || align=right data-sort-value="0.64" | 640 m || 
|-id=012 bgcolor=#E9E9E9
| 337012 || 1994 NF || — || July 3, 1994 || Kitt Peak || Spacewatch || — || align=right | 1.4 km || 
|-id=013 bgcolor=#E9E9E9
| 337013 ||  || — || August 10, 1994 || La Silla || E. W. Elst || — || align=right | 2.3 km || 
|-id=014 bgcolor=#E9E9E9
| 337014 ||  || — || September 28, 1994 || Kitt Peak || Spacewatch || MRX || align=right data-sort-value="0.76" | 760 m || 
|-id=015 bgcolor=#E9E9E9
| 337015 ||  || — || October 9, 1994 || Kitt Peak || Spacewatch || — || align=right | 2.4 km || 
|-id=016 bgcolor=#fefefe
| 337016 ||  || — || October 9, 1994 || Kitt Peak || Spacewatch || NYS || align=right data-sort-value="0.62" | 620 m || 
|-id=017 bgcolor=#E9E9E9
| 337017 ||  || — || February 22, 1995 || Kitt Peak || Spacewatch || GEF || align=right | 1.6 km || 
|-id=018 bgcolor=#C2FFFF
| 337018 ||  || — || March 23, 1995 || Kitt Peak || Spacewatch || L5 || align=right | 9.0 km || 
|-id=019 bgcolor=#C2FFFF
| 337019 ||  || — || March 26, 1995 || Kitt Peak || Spacewatch || L5 || align=right | 11 km || 
|-id=020 bgcolor=#d6d6d6
| 337020 ||  || — || July 22, 1995 || Kitt Peak || Spacewatch || EOS || align=right | 2.2 km || 
|-id=021 bgcolor=#E9E9E9
| 337021 ||  || — || July 22, 1995 || Kitt Peak || Spacewatch || — || align=right | 1.1 km || 
|-id=022 bgcolor=#fefefe
| 337022 ||  || — || August 17, 1995 || Kitt Peak || Spacewatch || — || align=right data-sort-value="0.59" | 590 m || 
|-id=023 bgcolor=#d6d6d6
| 337023 ||  || — || September 17, 1995 || Kitt Peak || Spacewatch || — || align=right | 4.2 km || 
|-id=024 bgcolor=#E9E9E9
| 337024 ||  || — || September 18, 1995 || Kitt Peak || Spacewatch || — || align=right | 1.3 km || 
|-id=025 bgcolor=#d6d6d6
| 337025 ||  || — || September 19, 1995 || Kitt Peak || Spacewatch || THM || align=right | 2.3 km || 
|-id=026 bgcolor=#E9E9E9
| 337026 ||  || — || September 19, 1995 || Kitt Peak || Spacewatch || — || align=right | 1.7 km || 
|-id=027 bgcolor=#d6d6d6
| 337027 ||  || — || September 21, 1995 || Kitt Peak || Spacewatch || — || align=right | 4.0 km || 
|-id=028 bgcolor=#d6d6d6
| 337028 ||  || — || September 22, 1995 || Kitt Peak || Spacewatch || VER || align=right | 2.6 km || 
|-id=029 bgcolor=#E9E9E9
| 337029 ||  || — || September 23, 1995 || Kitt Peak || Spacewatch || — || align=right | 1.3 km || 
|-id=030 bgcolor=#d6d6d6
| 337030 ||  || — || September 24, 1995 || Kitt Peak || Spacewatch || — || align=right | 2.9 km || 
|-id=031 bgcolor=#E9E9E9
| 337031 ||  || — || September 24, 1995 || Kitt Peak || Spacewatch || — || align=right | 1.2 km || 
|-id=032 bgcolor=#E9E9E9
| 337032 ||  || — || September 26, 1995 || Kitt Peak || Spacewatch || — || align=right | 1.3 km || 
|-id=033 bgcolor=#d6d6d6
| 337033 ||  || — || September 18, 1995 || Kitt Peak || Spacewatch || THM || align=right | 2.3 km || 
|-id=034 bgcolor=#d6d6d6
| 337034 ||  || — || September 20, 1995 || Kitt Peak || Spacewatch || — || align=right | 2.5 km || 
|-id=035 bgcolor=#d6d6d6
| 337035 ||  || — || October 17, 1995 || Kitt Peak || Spacewatch || — || align=right | 3.2 km || 
|-id=036 bgcolor=#d6d6d6
| 337036 ||  || — || October 20, 1995 || Kitt Peak || Spacewatch || THM || align=right | 2.9 km || 
|-id=037 bgcolor=#fefefe
| 337037 ||  || — || October 20, 1995 || Kitt Peak || Spacewatch || — || align=right data-sort-value="0.68" | 680 m || 
|-id=038 bgcolor=#d6d6d6
| 337038 ||  || — || October 27, 1995 || Kitt Peak || Spacewatch || — || align=right | 3.1 km || 
|-id=039 bgcolor=#E9E9E9
| 337039 ||  || — || October 25, 1995 || Kitt Peak || Spacewatch || — || align=right | 1.3 km || 
|-id=040 bgcolor=#E9E9E9
| 337040 ||  || — || November 19, 1995 || Kitt Peak || Spacewatch || JUN || align=right data-sort-value="0.93" | 930 m || 
|-id=041 bgcolor=#fefefe
| 337041 ||  || — || December 14, 1995 || Kitt Peak || Spacewatch || FLO || align=right data-sort-value="0.72" | 720 m || 
|-id=042 bgcolor=#d6d6d6
| 337042 ||  || — || December 14, 1995 || Kitt Peak || Spacewatch || HYG || align=right | 3.1 km || 
|-id=043 bgcolor=#fefefe
| 337043 ||  || — || January 15, 1996 || Kitt Peak || Spacewatch || — || align=right data-sort-value="0.97" | 970 m || 
|-id=044 bgcolor=#fefefe
| 337044 Bobdylan ||  ||  || February 16, 1996 || Caussols || E. W. Elst || NYS || align=right data-sort-value="0.86" | 860 m || 
|-id=045 bgcolor=#d6d6d6
| 337045 ||  || — || September 15, 1996 || Kitt Peak || Spacewatch || — || align=right | 2.4 km || 
|-id=046 bgcolor=#E9E9E9
| 337046 ||  || — || October 15, 1996 || Oohira || T. Urata || — || align=right | 1.4 km || 
|-id=047 bgcolor=#d6d6d6
| 337047 ||  || — || October 7, 1996 || Kitt Peak || Spacewatch || THM || align=right | 2.2 km || 
|-id=048 bgcolor=#fefefe
| 337048 ||  || — || October 7, 1996 || Kitt Peak || Spacewatch || — || align=right data-sort-value="0.59" | 590 m || 
|-id=049 bgcolor=#d6d6d6
| 337049 ||  || — || November 11, 1996 || Prescott || P. G. Comba || — || align=right | 2.5 km || 
|-id=050 bgcolor=#E9E9E9
| 337050 ||  || — || November 5, 1996 || Kitt Peak || Spacewatch || — || align=right | 1.5 km || 
|-id=051 bgcolor=#d6d6d6
| 337051 ||  || — || November 10, 1996 || Kitt Peak || Spacewatch || — || align=right | 3.1 km || 
|-id=052 bgcolor=#E9E9E9
| 337052 ||  || — || November 13, 1996 || Kitt Peak || Spacewatch || — || align=right | 1.3 km || 
|-id=053 bgcolor=#FFC2E0
| 337053 ||  || — || December 2, 1996 || Kitt Peak || Spacewatch || APO || align=right data-sort-value="0.56" | 560 m || 
|-id=054 bgcolor=#E9E9E9
| 337054 ||  || — || December 12, 1996 || Kitt Peak || Spacewatch || — || align=right | 1.3 km || 
|-id=055 bgcolor=#fefefe
| 337055 ||  || — || January 31, 1997 || Kuma Kogen || A. Nakamura || FLO || align=right data-sort-value="0.77" | 770 m || 
|-id=056 bgcolor=#E9E9E9
| 337056 ||  || — || March 3, 1997 || Kitt Peak || Spacewatch || — || align=right | 1.7 km || 
|-id=057 bgcolor=#fefefe
| 337057 ||  || — || March 2, 1997 || Kitt Peak || Spacewatch || — || align=right | 1.2 km || 
|-id=058 bgcolor=#E9E9E9
| 337058 ||  || — || April 3, 1997 || Socorro || LINEAR || — || align=right | 1.9 km || 
|-id=059 bgcolor=#E9E9E9
| 337059 ||  || — || June 2, 1997 || Kitt Peak || Spacewatch || — || align=right | 2.3 km || 
|-id=060 bgcolor=#fefefe
| 337060 ||  || — || June 29, 1997 || Kitt Peak || Spacewatch || V || align=right data-sort-value="0.85" | 850 m || 
|-id=061 bgcolor=#d6d6d6
| 337061 ||  || — || September 10, 1997 || Bergisch Gladbach || W. Bickel || — || align=right | 2.2 km || 
|-id=062 bgcolor=#fefefe
| 337062 ||  || — || September 30, 1997 || Kitt Peak || Spacewatch || critical || align=right data-sort-value="0.82" | 820 m || 
|-id=063 bgcolor=#fefefe
| 337063 ||  || — || October 3, 1997 || Caussols || ODAS || NYS || align=right data-sort-value="0.76" | 760 m || 
|-id=064 bgcolor=#fefefe
| 337064 ||  || — || November 23, 1997 || Kitt Peak || Spacewatch || — || align=right data-sort-value="0.92" | 920 m || 
|-id=065 bgcolor=#fefefe
| 337065 ||  || — || January 1, 1998 || Kitt Peak || Spacewatch || SUL || align=right | 2.0 km || 
|-id=066 bgcolor=#FA8072
| 337066 ||  || — || January 25, 1998 || Haleakala || NEAT || — || align=right | 1.8 km || 
|-id=067 bgcolor=#d6d6d6
| 337067 ||  || — || January 22, 1998 || Kitt Peak || Spacewatch || SHU3:2 || align=right | 6.2 km || 
|-id=068 bgcolor=#d6d6d6
| 337068 ||  || — || March 24, 1998 || Socorro || LINEAR || — || align=right | 3.6 km || 
|-id=069 bgcolor=#FFC2E0
| 337069 ||  || — || March 20, 1998 || Socorro || LINEAR || AMO || align=right data-sort-value="0.71" | 710 m || 
|-id=070 bgcolor=#fefefe
| 337070 || 1998 HJ || — || April 17, 1998 || Kitt Peak || Spacewatch || — || align=right data-sort-value="0.67" | 670 m || 
|-id=071 bgcolor=#E9E9E9
| 337071 || 1998 HY || — || April 17, 1998 || Kitt Peak || Spacewatch || MAR || align=right | 1.4 km || 
|-id=072 bgcolor=#fefefe
| 337072 ||  || — || April 21, 1998 || Socorro || LINEAR || H || align=right data-sort-value="0.77" | 770 m || 
|-id=073 bgcolor=#E9E9E9
| 337073 ||  || — || April 30, 1998 || Kitt Peak || Spacewatch || — || align=right | 1.6 km || 
|-id=074 bgcolor=#FA8072
| 337074 ||  || — || April 23, 1998 || Socorro || LINEAR || unusual || align=right | 2.3 km || 
|-id=075 bgcolor=#FFC2E0
| 337075 ||  || — || August 17, 1998 || Socorro || LINEAR || APOPHAcritical || align=right data-sort-value="0.40" | 400 m || 
|-id=076 bgcolor=#E9E9E9
| 337076 ||  || — || August 30, 1998 || Kitt Peak || Spacewatch || MRX || align=right | 1.4 km || 
|-id=077 bgcolor=#fefefe
| 337077 ||  || — || September 12, 1998 || Kitt Peak || Spacewatch || FLO || align=right data-sort-value="0.76" | 760 m || 
|-id=078 bgcolor=#FA8072
| 337078 ||  || — || September 14, 1998 || Kitt Peak || Spacewatch || — || align=right data-sort-value="0.71" | 710 m || 
|-id=079 bgcolor=#E9E9E9
| 337079 ||  || — || September 15, 1998 || Kitt Peak || Spacewatch || WIT || align=right | 1.1 km || 
|-id=080 bgcolor=#fefefe
| 337080 ||  || — || September 14, 1998 || Socorro || LINEAR || — || align=right data-sort-value="0.86" | 860 m || 
|-id=081 bgcolor=#fefefe
| 337081 ||  || — || September 14, 1998 || Socorro || LINEAR || FLO || align=right data-sort-value="0.74" | 740 m || 
|-id=082 bgcolor=#fefefe
| 337082 ||  || — || September 14, 1998 || Socorro || LINEAR || — || align=right | 1.3 km || 
|-id=083 bgcolor=#fefefe
| 337083 ||  || — || September 15, 1998 || Kitt Peak || Spacewatch || — || align=right data-sort-value="0.73" | 730 m || 
|-id=084 bgcolor=#FFC2E0
| 337084 ||  || — || September 26, 1998 || Socorro || LINEAR || AMO || align=right data-sort-value="0.42" | 420 m || 
|-id=085 bgcolor=#fefefe
| 337085 ||  || — || September 25, 1998 || Kitt Peak || Spacewatch || — || align=right data-sort-value="0.77" | 770 m || 
|-id=086 bgcolor=#fefefe
| 337086 ||  || — || September 25, 1998 || Anderson Mesa || LONEOS || — || align=right | 1.1 km || 
|-id=087 bgcolor=#FA8072
| 337087 ||  || — || September 16, 1998 || Anderson Mesa || LONEOS || — || align=right data-sort-value="0.78" | 780 m || 
|-id=088 bgcolor=#fefefe
| 337088 ||  || — || October 12, 1998 || Kitt Peak || Spacewatch || — || align=right | 1.2 km || 
|-id=089 bgcolor=#fefefe
| 337089 ||  || — || October 12, 1998 || Kitt Peak || Spacewatch || NYS || align=right | 2.0 km || 
|-id=090 bgcolor=#fefefe
| 337090 ||  || — || October 15, 1998 || Xinglong || SCAP || PHO || align=right data-sort-value="0.79" | 790 m || 
|-id=091 bgcolor=#FA8072
| 337091 ||  || — || October 18, 1998 || Kitt Peak || Spacewatch || — || align=right data-sort-value="0.78" | 780 m || 
|-id=092 bgcolor=#E9E9E9
| 337092 ||  || — || October 16, 1998 || Kitt Peak || Spacewatch || HOF || align=right | 3.1 km || 
|-id=093 bgcolor=#E9E9E9
| 337093 ||  || — || October 27, 1998 || Catalina || CSS || — || align=right | 2.3 km || 
|-id=094 bgcolor=#fefefe
| 337094 ||  || — || November 10, 1998 || Caussols || ODAS || V || align=right data-sort-value="0.66" | 660 m || 
|-id=095 bgcolor=#fefefe
| 337095 ||  || — || November 14, 1998 || Kitt Peak || Spacewatch || — || align=right data-sort-value="0.68" | 680 m || 
|-id=096 bgcolor=#FA8072
| 337096 ||  || — || November 21, 1998 || Socorro || LINEAR || — || align=right | 1.4 km || 
|-id=097 bgcolor=#E9E9E9
| 337097 ||  || — || December 8, 1998 || Kitt Peak || Spacewatch || GEF || align=right | 1.8 km || 
|-id=098 bgcolor=#fefefe
| 337098 ||  || — || December 7, 1998 || Caussols || ODAS || — || align=right data-sort-value="0.90" | 900 m || 
|-id=099 bgcolor=#fefefe
| 337099 || 1999 DH || — || February 16, 1999 || Caussols || ODAS || ERI || align=right | 1.8 km || 
|-id=100 bgcolor=#d6d6d6
| 337100 ||  || — || March 19, 1999 || Kitt Peak || Spacewatch || — || align=right | 3.6 km || 
|}

337101–337200 

|-bgcolor=#d6d6d6
| 337101 ||  || — || March 20, 1999 || Apache Point || SDSS || — || align=right | 4.4 km || 
|-id=102 bgcolor=#d6d6d6
| 337102 ||  || — || March 20, 1999 || Apache Point || SDSS || EUP || align=right | 3.5 km || 
|-id=103 bgcolor=#FA8072
| 337103 ||  || — || May 10, 1999 || Socorro || LINEAR || — || align=right | 1.4 km || 
|-id=104 bgcolor=#FA8072
| 337104 ||  || — || July 14, 1999 || Socorro || LINEAR || — || align=right | 2.4 km || 
|-id=105 bgcolor=#E9E9E9
| 337105 ||  || — || September 7, 1999 || Socorro || LINEAR || — || align=right | 2.3 km || 
|-id=106 bgcolor=#E9E9E9
| 337106 ||  || — || September 7, 1999 || Socorro || LINEAR || — || align=right | 2.9 km || 
|-id=107 bgcolor=#E9E9E9
| 337107 ||  || — || September 7, 1999 || Socorro || LINEAR || — || align=right | 1.8 km || 
|-id=108 bgcolor=#E9E9E9
| 337108 ||  || — || September 7, 1999 || Socorro || LINEAR || IAN || align=right | 1.3 km || 
|-id=109 bgcolor=#E9E9E9
| 337109 ||  || — || September 7, 1999 || Socorro || LINEAR || — || align=right | 1.9 km || 
|-id=110 bgcolor=#FA8072
| 337110 ||  || — || September 8, 1999 || Socorro || LINEAR || — || align=right data-sort-value="0.98" | 980 m || 
|-id=111 bgcolor=#E9E9E9
| 337111 ||  || — || September 9, 1999 || Socorro || LINEAR || — || align=right | 1.6 km || 
|-id=112 bgcolor=#E9E9E9
| 337112 ||  || — || September 11, 1999 || Socorro || LINEAR || — || align=right | 2.3 km || 
|-id=113 bgcolor=#E9E9E9
| 337113 ||  || — || September 15, 1999 || Kitt Peak || Spacewatch || — || align=right | 1.3 km || 
|-id=114 bgcolor=#E9E9E9
| 337114 ||  || — || September 8, 1999 || Socorro || LINEAR || IAN || align=right | 1.3 km || 
|-id=115 bgcolor=#E9E9E9
| 337115 ||  || — || September 29, 1999 || Socorro || LINEAR || — || align=right | 3.5 km || 
|-id=116 bgcolor=#E9E9E9
| 337116 ||  || — || September 30, 1999 || Socorro || LINEAR || GER || align=right | 2.5 km || 
|-id=117 bgcolor=#E9E9E9
| 337117 ||  || — || September 30, 1999 || Kitt Peak || Spacewatch || — || align=right | 1.5 km || 
|-id=118 bgcolor=#FFC2E0
| 337118 ||  || — || October 2, 1999 || Catalina || CSS || APO +1km || align=right data-sort-value="0.80" | 800 m || 
|-id=119 bgcolor=#FFC2E0
| 337119 ||  || — || October 10, 1999 || Socorro || LINEAR || AMO || align=right data-sort-value="0.52" | 520 m || 
|-id=120 bgcolor=#E9E9E9
| 337120 ||  || — || October 12, 1999 || Fountain Hills || C. W. Juels || — || align=right | 2.2 km || 
|-id=121 bgcolor=#E9E9E9
| 337121 ||  || — || October 3, 1999 || Socorro || LINEAR || IAN || align=right | 1.6 km || 
|-id=122 bgcolor=#E9E9E9
| 337122 ||  || — || October 2, 1999 || Catalina || CSS || — || align=right | 1.9 km || 
|-id=123 bgcolor=#E9E9E9
| 337123 ||  || — || October 3, 1999 || Catalina || CSS || — || align=right | 2.2 km || 
|-id=124 bgcolor=#E9E9E9
| 337124 ||  || — || October 4, 1999 || Kitt Peak || Spacewatch || — || align=right | 2.3 km || 
|-id=125 bgcolor=#E9E9E9
| 337125 ||  || — || October 6, 1999 || Kitt Peak || Spacewatch || WIT || align=right | 1.2 km || 
|-id=126 bgcolor=#E9E9E9
| 337126 ||  || — || October 7, 1999 || Kitt Peak || Spacewatch || — || align=right | 2.4 km || 
|-id=127 bgcolor=#E9E9E9
| 337127 ||  || — || October 9, 1999 || Kitt Peak || Spacewatch || — || align=right | 2.1 km || 
|-id=128 bgcolor=#E9E9E9
| 337128 ||  || — || October 9, 1999 || Kitt Peak || Spacewatch || — || align=right | 1.8 km || 
|-id=129 bgcolor=#E9E9E9
| 337129 ||  || — || October 10, 1999 || Kitt Peak || Spacewatch || — || align=right | 2.0 km || 
|-id=130 bgcolor=#E9E9E9
| 337130 ||  || — || October 4, 1999 || Socorro || LINEAR || — || align=right | 2.3 km || 
|-id=131 bgcolor=#E9E9E9
| 337131 ||  || — || October 4, 1999 || Socorro || LINEAR || — || align=right | 2.7 km || 
|-id=132 bgcolor=#E9E9E9
| 337132 ||  || — || October 6, 1999 || Socorro || LINEAR || — || align=right | 2.1 km || 
|-id=133 bgcolor=#E9E9E9
| 337133 ||  || — || October 7, 1999 || Socorro || LINEAR || — || align=right | 2.9 km || 
|-id=134 bgcolor=#E9E9E9
| 337134 ||  || — || October 7, 1999 || Socorro || LINEAR || — || align=right | 2.1 km || 
|-id=135 bgcolor=#E9E9E9
| 337135 ||  || — || October 10, 1999 || Socorro || LINEAR || — || align=right | 2.2 km || 
|-id=136 bgcolor=#E9E9E9
| 337136 ||  || — || October 12, 1999 || Socorro || LINEAR || IAN || align=right | 1.5 km || 
|-id=137 bgcolor=#E9E9E9
| 337137 ||  || — || October 12, 1999 || Socorro || LINEAR || — || align=right | 2.8 km || 
|-id=138 bgcolor=#E9E9E9
| 337138 ||  || — || October 13, 1999 || Socorro || LINEAR || — || align=right | 1.5 km || 
|-id=139 bgcolor=#fefefe
| 337139 ||  || — || October 15, 1999 || Socorro || LINEAR || H || align=right data-sort-value="0.89" | 890 m || 
|-id=140 bgcolor=#E9E9E9
| 337140 ||  || — || October 15, 1999 || Socorro || LINEAR || — || align=right | 1.8 km || 
|-id=141 bgcolor=#E9E9E9
| 337141 ||  || — || October 2, 1999 || Catalina || CSS || ADE || align=right | 2.7 km || 
|-id=142 bgcolor=#E9E9E9
| 337142 ||  || — || October 3, 1999 || Kitt Peak || Spacewatch || ADE || align=right | 2.3 km || 
|-id=143 bgcolor=#E9E9E9
| 337143 ||  || — || October 2, 1999 || Anderson Mesa || LONEOS || — || align=right | 2.0 km || 
|-id=144 bgcolor=#FA8072
| 337144 ||  || — || October 5, 1999 || Catalina || CSS || — || align=right data-sort-value="0.86" | 860 m || 
|-id=145 bgcolor=#E9E9E9
| 337145 ||  || — || October 9, 1999 || Socorro || LINEAR || — || align=right | 1.8 km || 
|-id=146 bgcolor=#E9E9E9
| 337146 ||  || — || October 3, 1999 || Socorro || LINEAR || — || align=right | 2.1 km || 
|-id=147 bgcolor=#E9E9E9
| 337147 ||  || — || October 3, 1999 || Socorro || LINEAR || — || align=right | 2.1 km || 
|-id=148 bgcolor=#E9E9E9
| 337148 ||  || — || October 3, 1999 || Socorro || LINEAR || — || align=right | 1.9 km || 
|-id=149 bgcolor=#E9E9E9
| 337149 ||  || — || October 3, 1999 || Catalina || CSS || JUN || align=right | 1.2 km || 
|-id=150 bgcolor=#E9E9E9
| 337150 ||  || — || October 4, 1999 || Kitt Peak || Spacewatch || — || align=right | 1.4 km || 
|-id=151 bgcolor=#E9E9E9
| 337151 ||  || — || October 8, 1999 || Kitt Peak || Spacewatch || — || align=right | 2.0 km || 
|-id=152 bgcolor=#E9E9E9
| 337152 ||  || — || October 8, 1999 || Kitt Peak || Spacewatch || — || align=right | 1.7 km || 
|-id=153 bgcolor=#E9E9E9
| 337153 ||  || — || September 11, 1999 || Anderson Mesa || LONEOS || — || align=right | 3.0 km || 
|-id=154 bgcolor=#E9E9E9
| 337154 ||  || — || October 11, 1999 || Kitt Peak || Spacewatch || — || align=right | 1.2 km || 
|-id=155 bgcolor=#E9E9E9
| 337155 ||  || — || October 10, 1999 || Kitt Peak || Spacewatch || — || align=right | 1.7 km || 
|-id=156 bgcolor=#fefefe
| 337156 ||  || — || October 14, 1999 || Apache Point || SDSS || FLO || align=right data-sort-value="0.55" | 550 m || 
|-id=157 bgcolor=#FA8072
| 337157 ||  || — || October 30, 1999 || Catalina || CSS || — || align=right | 2.2 km || 
|-id=158 bgcolor=#E9E9E9
| 337158 ||  || — || October 31, 1999 || Kitt Peak || Spacewatch || BAR || align=right | 2.3 km || 
|-id=159 bgcolor=#E9E9E9
| 337159 ||  || — || October 30, 1999 || Kitt Peak || Spacewatch || — || align=right | 1.3 km || 
|-id=160 bgcolor=#E9E9E9
| 337160 ||  || — || October 30, 1999 || Kitt Peak || Spacewatch || ADE || align=right | 2.6 km || 
|-id=161 bgcolor=#E9E9E9
| 337161 ||  || — || October 31, 1999 || Kitt Peak || Spacewatch || — || align=right | 1.5 km || 
|-id=162 bgcolor=#E9E9E9
| 337162 ||  || — || October 31, 1999 || Kitt Peak || Spacewatch || BAR || align=right | 1.3 km || 
|-id=163 bgcolor=#E9E9E9
| 337163 ||  || — || October 28, 1999 || Catalina || CSS || — || align=right | 2.2 km || 
|-id=164 bgcolor=#E9E9E9
| 337164 ||  || — || October 31, 1999 || Kitt Peak || Spacewatch || — || align=right | 1.5 km || 
|-id=165 bgcolor=#E9E9E9
| 337165 ||  || — || October 31, 1999 || Catalina || CSS || — || align=right | 2.2 km || 
|-id=166 bgcolor=#E9E9E9
| 337166 Ivanartioukhov ||  ||  || November 1, 1999 || Uccle || E. W. Elst, S. I. Ipatov || — || align=right | 2.4 km || 
|-id=167 bgcolor=#FA8072
| 337167 ||  || — || November 2, 1999 || Socorro || LINEAR || H || align=right data-sort-value="0.96" | 960 m || 
|-id=168 bgcolor=#fefefe
| 337168 ||  || — || November 2, 1999 || Socorro || LINEAR || H || align=right data-sort-value="0.88" | 880 m || 
|-id=169 bgcolor=#E9E9E9
| 337169 ||  || — || November 10, 1999 || Kitt Peak || M. W. Buie || — || align=right | 2.1 km || 
|-id=170 bgcolor=#E9E9E9
| 337170 ||  || — || November 3, 1999 || Socorro || LINEAR || JUN || align=right | 1.6 km || 
|-id=171 bgcolor=#E9E9E9
| 337171 ||  || — || November 4, 1999 || Kitt Peak || Spacewatch || — || align=right | 1.5 km || 
|-id=172 bgcolor=#E9E9E9
| 337172 ||  || — || October 15, 1999 || Socorro || LINEAR || — || align=right | 1.6 km || 
|-id=173 bgcolor=#E9E9E9
| 337173 ||  || — || November 4, 1999 || Kitt Peak || Spacewatch || — || align=right | 1.3 km || 
|-id=174 bgcolor=#E9E9E9
| 337174 ||  || — || November 4, 1999 || Socorro || LINEAR || JUN || align=right | 1.2 km || 
|-id=175 bgcolor=#E9E9E9
| 337175 ||  || — || November 4, 1999 || Socorro || LINEAR || — || align=right | 1.1 km || 
|-id=176 bgcolor=#E9E9E9
| 337176 ||  || — || November 5, 1999 || Kitt Peak || Spacewatch || — || align=right | 1.1 km || 
|-id=177 bgcolor=#E9E9E9
| 337177 ||  || — || November 5, 1999 || Kitt Peak || Spacewatch || NEM || align=right | 2.0 km || 
|-id=178 bgcolor=#E9E9E9
| 337178 ||  || — || November 4, 1999 || Socorro || LINEAR || — || align=right | 1.5 km || 
|-id=179 bgcolor=#E9E9E9
| 337179 ||  || — || November 1, 1999 || Kitt Peak || Spacewatch || — || align=right | 2.2 km || 
|-id=180 bgcolor=#E9E9E9
| 337180 ||  || — || November 9, 1999 || Socorro || LINEAR || — || align=right | 2.2 km || 
|-id=181 bgcolor=#fefefe
| 337181 ||  || — || November 5, 1999 || Kitt Peak || Spacewatch || H || align=right data-sort-value="0.82" | 820 m || 
|-id=182 bgcolor=#E9E9E9
| 337182 ||  || — || November 9, 1999 || Kitt Peak || Spacewatch || ADE || align=right | 1.8 km || 
|-id=183 bgcolor=#E9E9E9
| 337183 ||  || — || November 3, 1999 || Kitt Peak || Spacewatch || — || align=right | 1.7 km || 
|-id=184 bgcolor=#E9E9E9
| 337184 ||  || — || November 9, 1999 || Kitt Peak || Spacewatch || — || align=right | 1.8 km || 
|-id=185 bgcolor=#E9E9E9
| 337185 ||  || — || November 10, 1999 || Kitt Peak || Spacewatch || MIS || align=right | 2.8 km || 
|-id=186 bgcolor=#fefefe
| 337186 ||  || — || November 11, 1999 || Catalina || CSS || — || align=right data-sort-value="0.95" | 950 m || 
|-id=187 bgcolor=#E9E9E9
| 337187 ||  || — || November 9, 1999 || Socorro || LINEAR || — || align=right | 1.9 km || 
|-id=188 bgcolor=#E9E9E9
| 337188 ||  || — || November 13, 1999 || Kitt Peak || Spacewatch || JUN || align=right | 1.3 km || 
|-id=189 bgcolor=#E9E9E9
| 337189 ||  || — || November 12, 1999 || Socorro || LINEAR || — || align=right | 1.4 km || 
|-id=190 bgcolor=#E9E9E9
| 337190 ||  || — || November 14, 1999 || Socorro || LINEAR || — || align=right | 1.8 km || 
|-id=191 bgcolor=#E9E9E9
| 337191 ||  || — || November 9, 1999 || Socorro || LINEAR || HNS || align=right | 1.6 km || 
|-id=192 bgcolor=#E9E9E9
| 337192 ||  || — || November 9, 1999 || Socorro || LINEAR || ADE || align=right | 2.6 km || 
|-id=193 bgcolor=#fefefe
| 337193 ||  || — || November 3, 1999 || Catalina || CSS || FLO || align=right data-sort-value="0.82" | 820 m || 
|-id=194 bgcolor=#E9E9E9
| 337194 ||  || — || November 15, 1999 || Socorro || LINEAR || — || align=right | 2.3 km || 
|-id=195 bgcolor=#E9E9E9
| 337195 ||  || — || November 12, 1999 || Socorro || LINEAR || — || align=right | 1.9 km || 
|-id=196 bgcolor=#fefefe
| 337196 ||  || — || October 10, 1999 || Socorro || LINEAR || — || align=right data-sort-value="0.98" | 980 m || 
|-id=197 bgcolor=#E9E9E9
| 337197 ||  || — || November 30, 1999 || Kitt Peak || Spacewatch || — || align=right | 2.7 km || 
|-id=198 bgcolor=#E9E9E9
| 337198 ||  || — || November 30, 1999 || Kitt Peak || Spacewatch || JUN || align=right | 1.2 km || 
|-id=199 bgcolor=#fefefe
| 337199 ||  || — || November 17, 1999 || Kitt Peak || Spacewatch || — || align=right data-sort-value="0.69" | 690 m || 
|-id=200 bgcolor=#E9E9E9
| 337200 ||  || — || December 5, 1999 || Socorro || LINEAR || — || align=right | 2.3 km || 
|}

337201–337300 

|-bgcolor=#fefefe
| 337201 ||  || — || December 7, 1999 || Socorro || LINEAR || — || align=right | 1.6 km || 
|-id=202 bgcolor=#E9E9E9
| 337202 ||  || — || December 7, 1999 || Socorro || LINEAR || — || align=right | 2.9 km || 
|-id=203 bgcolor=#E9E9E9
| 337203 ||  || — || December 6, 1999 || Socorro || LINEAR || — || align=right | 2.9 km || 
|-id=204 bgcolor=#E9E9E9
| 337204 ||  || — || December 7, 1999 || Socorro || LINEAR || — || align=right | 1.6 km || 
|-id=205 bgcolor=#E9E9E9
| 337205 ||  || — || December 12, 1999 || Socorro || LINEAR || — || align=right | 3.0 km || 
|-id=206 bgcolor=#fefefe
| 337206 ||  || — || December 7, 1999 || Catalina || CSS || — || align=right data-sort-value="0.87" | 870 m || 
|-id=207 bgcolor=#E9E9E9
| 337207 ||  || — || December 5, 1999 || Catalina || CSS || — || align=right | 3.0 km || 
|-id=208 bgcolor=#fefefe
| 337208 ||  || — || December 7, 1999 || Kitt Peak || Spacewatch || — || align=right data-sort-value="0.92" | 920 m || 
|-id=209 bgcolor=#fefefe
| 337209 ||  || — || December 27, 1999 || Kitt Peak || Spacewatch || — || align=right data-sort-value="0.99" | 990 m || 
|-id=210 bgcolor=#E9E9E9
| 337210 ||  || — || January 4, 2000 || Socorro || LINEAR || — || align=right | 3.0 km || 
|-id=211 bgcolor=#fefefe
| 337211 ||  || — || January 4, 2000 || Socorro || LINEAR || — || align=right | 1.0 km || 
|-id=212 bgcolor=#E9E9E9
| 337212 ||  || — || January 9, 2000 || Kitt Peak || Spacewatch || GEF || align=right | 1.7 km || 
|-id=213 bgcolor=#E9E9E9
| 337213 ||  || — || January 12, 2000 || Kitt Peak || Spacewatch || — || align=right | 2.7 km || 
|-id=214 bgcolor=#FA8072
| 337214 ||  || — || January 25, 2000 || Socorro || LINEAR || — || align=right | 2.2 km || 
|-id=215 bgcolor=#d6d6d6
| 337215 ||  || — || January 28, 2000 || Kitt Peak || Spacewatch || CHA || align=right | 1.9 km || 
|-id=216 bgcolor=#fefefe
| 337216 ||  || — || January 29, 2000 || Kitt Peak || Spacewatch || — || align=right | 1.2 km || 
|-id=217 bgcolor=#fefefe
| 337217 ||  || — || January 27, 2000 || Kitt Peak || Spacewatch || NYS || align=right data-sort-value="0.62" | 620 m || 
|-id=218 bgcolor=#fefefe
| 337218 ||  || — || January 28, 2000 || Kitt Peak || Spacewatch || — || align=right data-sort-value="0.77" | 770 m || 
|-id=219 bgcolor=#fefefe
| 337219 ||  || — || February 10, 2000 || Kitt Peak || Spacewatch || FLO || align=right data-sort-value="0.73" | 730 m || 
|-id=220 bgcolor=#d6d6d6
| 337220 ||  || — || February 5, 2000 || Kitt Peak || M. W. Buie || — || align=right | 3.3 km || 
|-id=221 bgcolor=#fefefe
| 337221 ||  || — || February 3, 2000 || Kitt Peak || Spacewatch || — || align=right | 1.0 km || 
|-id=222 bgcolor=#fefefe
| 337222 ||  || — || February 28, 2000 || Kitt Peak || Spacewatch || V || align=right data-sort-value="0.73" | 730 m || 
|-id=223 bgcolor=#E9E9E9
| 337223 ||  || — || March 3, 2000 || Socorro || LINEAR || — || align=right | 2.2 km || 
|-id=224 bgcolor=#fefefe
| 337224 ||  || — || March 3, 2000 || Socorro || LINEAR || — || align=right | 1.4 km || 
|-id=225 bgcolor=#fefefe
| 337225 ||  || — || March 3, 2000 || Socorro || LINEAR || — || align=right data-sort-value="0.85" | 850 m || 
|-id=226 bgcolor=#fefefe
| 337226 ||  || — || March 9, 2000 || Kitt Peak || Spacewatch || fast? || align=right data-sort-value="0.89" | 890 m || 
|-id=227 bgcolor=#fefefe
| 337227 ||  || — || February 25, 2000 || Kitt Peak || Spacewatch || — || align=right | 1.0 km || 
|-id=228 bgcolor=#FA8072
| 337228 ||  || — || March 26, 2000 || Socorro || LINEAR || Tj (2.79) || align=right | 4.7 km || 
|-id=229 bgcolor=#d6d6d6
| 337229 ||  || — || March 29, 2000 || Kitt Peak || Spacewatch || KOR || align=right | 1.6 km || 
|-id=230 bgcolor=#fefefe
| 337230 ||  || — || April 5, 2000 || Socorro || LINEAR || — || align=right | 1.2 km || 
|-id=231 bgcolor=#E9E9E9
| 337231 ||  || — || April 5, 2000 || Socorro || LINEAR || — || align=right | 2.9 km || 
|-id=232 bgcolor=#d6d6d6
| 337232 ||  || — || April 12, 2000 || Kitt Peak || Spacewatch || — || align=right | 2.9 km || 
|-id=233 bgcolor=#fefefe
| 337233 ||  || — || April 2, 2000 || Anderson Mesa || LONEOS || — || align=right | 1.2 km || 
|-id=234 bgcolor=#fefefe
| 337234 ||  || — || April 24, 2000 || Kitt Peak || Spacewatch || — || align=right data-sort-value="0.86" | 860 m || 
|-id=235 bgcolor=#fefefe
| 337235 ||  || — || April 30, 2000 || Socorro || LINEAR || V || align=right data-sort-value="0.92" | 920 m || 
|-id=236 bgcolor=#d6d6d6
| 337236 ||  || — || April 25, 2000 || Anderson Mesa || LONEOS || — || align=right | 3.2 km || 
|-id=237 bgcolor=#fefefe
| 337237 ||  || — || April 26, 2000 || Anderson Mesa || LONEOS || ERI || align=right | 2.1 km || 
|-id=238 bgcolor=#d6d6d6
| 337238 ||  || — || April 29, 2000 || Socorro || LINEAR || — || align=right | 2.7 km || 
|-id=239 bgcolor=#d6d6d6
| 337239 ||  || — || May 6, 2000 || Socorro || LINEAR || — || align=right | 3.2 km || 
|-id=240 bgcolor=#fefefe
| 337240 ||  || — || May 7, 2000 || Socorro || LINEAR || PHO || align=right | 1.8 km || 
|-id=241 bgcolor=#fefefe
| 337241 ||  || — || May 28, 2000 || Socorro || LINEAR || — || align=right | 4.5 km || 
|-id=242 bgcolor=#fefefe
| 337242 ||  || — || May 26, 2000 || Kitt Peak || Spacewatch || — || align=right | 1.0 km || 
|-id=243 bgcolor=#fefefe
| 337243 ||  || — || July 4, 2000 || Kitt Peak || Spacewatch || — || align=right data-sort-value="0.99" | 990 m || 
|-id=244 bgcolor=#d6d6d6
| 337244 ||  || — || August 9, 2000 || Socorro || LINEAR || — || align=right | 5.3 km || 
|-id=245 bgcolor=#d6d6d6
| 337245 ||  || — || August 29, 2000 || Siding Spring || R. H. McNaught || — || align=right | 5.0 km || 
|-id=246 bgcolor=#fefefe
| 337246 ||  || — || August 31, 2000 || Socorro || LINEAR || — || align=right data-sort-value="0.87" | 870 m || 
|-id=247 bgcolor=#d6d6d6
| 337247 ||  || — || August 31, 2000 || Kitt Peak || Spacewatch || LUT || align=right | 6.0 km || 
|-id=248 bgcolor=#FFC2E0
| 337248 ||  || — || September 5, 2000 || Anderson Mesa || LONEOS || ATE || align=right data-sort-value="0.85" | 850 m || 
|-id=249 bgcolor=#fefefe
| 337249 ||  || — || September 1, 2000 || Socorro || LINEAR || — || align=right | 1.6 km || 
|-id=250 bgcolor=#d6d6d6
| 337250 ||  || — || September 5, 2000 || Anderson Mesa || LONEOS || — || align=right | 6.1 km || 
|-id=251 bgcolor=#E9E9E9
| 337251 ||  || — || September 6, 2000 || Socorro || LINEAR || — || align=right | 1.2 km || 
|-id=252 bgcolor=#FFC2E0
| 337252 ||  || — || September 20, 2000 || Haleakala || NEAT || APO || align=right data-sort-value="0.26" | 260 m || 
|-id=253 bgcolor=#E9E9E9
| 337253 ||  || — || September 22, 2000 || Socorro || LINEAR || — || align=right | 1.5 km || 
|-id=254 bgcolor=#E9E9E9
| 337254 ||  || — || September 24, 2000 || Socorro || LINEAR || EUN || align=right | 1.4 km || 
|-id=255 bgcolor=#E9E9E9
| 337255 ||  || — || September 24, 2000 || Socorro || LINEAR || — || align=right | 1.3 km || 
|-id=256 bgcolor=#E9E9E9
| 337256 ||  || — || September 24, 2000 || Socorro || LINEAR || — || align=right | 1.6 km || 
|-id=257 bgcolor=#E9E9E9
| 337257 ||  || — || September 23, 2000 || Socorro || LINEAR || — || align=right | 1.1 km || 
|-id=258 bgcolor=#d6d6d6
| 337258 ||  || — || September 23, 2000 || Socorro || LINEAR || — || align=right | 4.4 km || 
|-id=259 bgcolor=#E9E9E9
| 337259 ||  || — || September 28, 2000 || Socorro || LINEAR || — || align=right | 1.2 km || 
|-id=260 bgcolor=#d6d6d6
| 337260 ||  || — || September 24, 2000 || Socorro || LINEAR || — || align=right | 3.7 km || 
|-id=261 bgcolor=#fefefe
| 337261 ||  || — || September 24, 2000 || Socorro || LINEAR || — || align=right data-sort-value="0.96" | 960 m || 
|-id=262 bgcolor=#fefefe
| 337262 ||  || — || September 24, 2000 || Socorro || LINEAR || — || align=right | 1.2 km || 
|-id=263 bgcolor=#E9E9E9
| 337263 ||  || — || September 26, 2000 || Socorro || LINEAR || — || align=right | 1.0 km || 
|-id=264 bgcolor=#E9E9E9
| 337264 ||  || — || September 24, 2000 || Socorro || LINEAR || — || align=right | 2.0 km || 
|-id=265 bgcolor=#E9E9E9
| 337265 ||  || — || September 24, 2000 || Socorro || LINEAR || — || align=right data-sort-value="0.85" | 850 m || 
|-id=266 bgcolor=#E9E9E9
| 337266 ||  || — || September 27, 2000 || Socorro || LINEAR || — || align=right | 1.9 km || 
|-id=267 bgcolor=#d6d6d6
| 337267 ||  || — || September 23, 2000 || Anderson Mesa || LONEOS || EUP || align=right | 4.1 km || 
|-id=268 bgcolor=#E9E9E9
| 337268 ||  || — || October 2, 2000 || Socorro || LINEAR || — || align=right | 1.4 km || 
|-id=269 bgcolor=#E9E9E9
| 337269 ||  || — || October 24, 2000 || Socorro || LINEAR || — || align=right | 1.2 km || 
|-id=270 bgcolor=#E9E9E9
| 337270 ||  || — || October 24, 2000 || Socorro || LINEAR || — || align=right | 1.1 km || 
|-id=271 bgcolor=#E9E9E9
| 337271 ||  || — || October 25, 2000 || Socorro || LINEAR || — || align=right | 1.1 km || 
|-id=272 bgcolor=#E9E9E9
| 337272 ||  || — || October 25, 2000 || Socorro || LINEAR || — || align=right | 1.4 km || 
|-id=273 bgcolor=#E9E9E9
| 337273 ||  || — || October 25, 2000 || Socorro || LINEAR || — || align=right | 1.3 km || 
|-id=274 bgcolor=#E9E9E9
| 337274 ||  || — || October 30, 2000 || Socorro || LINEAR || — || align=right | 3.2 km || 
|-id=275 bgcolor=#E9E9E9
| 337275 ||  || — || October 24, 2000 || Socorro || LINEAR || fast? || align=right | 1.2 km || 
|-id=276 bgcolor=#E9E9E9
| 337276 ||  || — || October 25, 2000 || Socorro || LINEAR || — || align=right | 1.1 km || 
|-id=277 bgcolor=#E9E9E9
| 337277 ||  || — || October 25, 2000 || Socorro || LINEAR || — || align=right | 1.4 km || 
|-id=278 bgcolor=#E9E9E9
| 337278 ||  || — || November 1, 2000 || Socorro || LINEAR || — || align=right data-sort-value="0.98" | 980 m || 
|-id=279 bgcolor=#E9E9E9
| 337279 ||  || — || November 6, 2000 || Socorro || LINEAR || — || align=right | 1.9 km || 
|-id=280 bgcolor=#E9E9E9
| 337280 ||  || — || November 1, 2000 || Kitt Peak || Spacewatch || — || align=right | 1.3 km || 
|-id=281 bgcolor=#E9E9E9
| 337281 ||  || — || November 20, 2000 || Socorro || LINEAR || — || align=right | 2.0 km || 
|-id=282 bgcolor=#E9E9E9
| 337282 ||  || — || November 20, 2000 || Socorro || LINEAR || — || align=right | 1.2 km || 
|-id=283 bgcolor=#FA8072
| 337283 ||  || — || November 27, 2000 || Socorro || LINEAR || critical || align=right data-sort-value="0.86" | 860 m || 
|-id=284 bgcolor=#E9E9E9
| 337284 ||  || — || November 20, 2000 || Socorro || LINEAR || — || align=right | 1.3 km || 
|-id=285 bgcolor=#E9E9E9
| 337285 ||  || — || November 21, 2000 || Socorro || LINEAR || MAR || align=right | 1.5 km || 
|-id=286 bgcolor=#E9E9E9
| 337286 ||  || — || November 20, 2000 || Socorro || LINEAR || — || align=right | 1.4 km || 
|-id=287 bgcolor=#E9E9E9
| 337287 ||  || — || November 28, 2000 || Kitt Peak || Spacewatch || — || align=right | 2.0 km || 
|-id=288 bgcolor=#E9E9E9
| 337288 ||  || — || November 30, 2000 || Socorro || LINEAR || — || align=right | 1.3 km || 
|-id=289 bgcolor=#E9E9E9
| 337289 ||  || — || November 25, 2000 || Kitt Peak || DLS || — || align=right | 1.8 km || 
|-id=290 bgcolor=#E9E9E9
| 337290 ||  || — || December 1, 2000 || Socorro || LINEAR || — || align=right | 2.0 km || 
|-id=291 bgcolor=#E9E9E9
| 337291 ||  || — || December 1, 2000 || Socorro || LINEAR || — || align=right | 2.1 km || 
|-id=292 bgcolor=#E9E9E9
| 337292 ||  || — || December 4, 2000 || Bohyunsan || Y.-B. Jeon, B.-C. Lee || — || align=right | 1.3 km || 
|-id=293 bgcolor=#E9E9E9
| 337293 ||  || — || December 4, 2000 || Socorro || LINEAR || — || align=right | 1.7 km || 
|-id=294 bgcolor=#E9E9E9
| 337294 ||  || — || December 4, 2000 || Socorro || LINEAR || — || align=right data-sort-value="0.84" | 840 m || 
|-id=295 bgcolor=#E9E9E9
| 337295 ||  || — || December 4, 2000 || Socorro || LINEAR || — || align=right | 3.1 km || 
|-id=296 bgcolor=#E9E9E9
| 337296 ||  || — || December 5, 2000 || Uccle || T. Pauwels || — || align=right | 1.3 km || 
|-id=297 bgcolor=#E9E9E9
| 337297 ||  || — || December 16, 2000 || Socorro || LINEAR || — || align=right | 2.5 km || 
|-id=298 bgcolor=#E9E9E9
| 337298 ||  || — || December 22, 2000 || Heppenheim || Starkenburg Obs. || — || align=right | 2.2 km || 
|-id=299 bgcolor=#E9E9E9
| 337299 ||  || — || December 17, 2000 || Kitt Peak || Spacewatch || — || align=right | 3.7 km || 
|-id=300 bgcolor=#E9E9E9
| 337300 ||  || — || December 21, 2000 || Kitt Peak || Spacewatch || — || align=right | 1.2 km || 
|}

337301–337400 

|-bgcolor=#E9E9E9
| 337301 ||  || — || December 28, 2000 || Kitt Peak || Spacewatch || — || align=right | 1.4 km || 
|-id=302 bgcolor=#E9E9E9
| 337302 ||  || — || December 28, 2000 || Socorro || LINEAR || — || align=right | 1.4 km || 
|-id=303 bgcolor=#E9E9E9
| 337303 ||  || — || December 30, 2000 || Kitt Peak || Spacewatch || — || align=right | 1.5 km || 
|-id=304 bgcolor=#E9E9E9
| 337304 ||  || — || December 30, 2000 || Socorro || LINEAR || — || align=right | 1.6 km || 
|-id=305 bgcolor=#E9E9E9
| 337305 ||  || — || December 30, 2000 || Socorro || LINEAR || — || align=right | 1.2 km || 
|-id=306 bgcolor=#E9E9E9
| 337306 ||  || — || December 30, 2000 || Socorro || LINEAR || — || align=right | 2.6 km || 
|-id=307 bgcolor=#E9E9E9
| 337307 ||  || — || December 30, 2000 || Socorro || LINEAR || — || align=right | 1.4 km || 
|-id=308 bgcolor=#E9E9E9
| 337308 ||  || — || December 30, 2000 || Socorro || LINEAR || — || align=right | 1.4 km || 
|-id=309 bgcolor=#E9E9E9
| 337309 ||  || — || December 29, 2000 || Junk Bond || Junk Bond Obs. || — || align=right | 1.8 km || 
|-id=310 bgcolor=#E9E9E9
| 337310 ||  || — || December 29, 2000 || Haleakala || NEAT || — || align=right | 2.6 km || 
|-id=311 bgcolor=#E9E9E9
| 337311 ||  || — || January 5, 2001 || Socorro || LINEAR || EUN || align=right | 1.9 km || 
|-id=312 bgcolor=#E9E9E9
| 337312 ||  || — || January 3, 2001 || Anderson Mesa || LONEOS || — || align=right | 1.2 km || 
|-id=313 bgcolor=#E9E9E9
| 337313 ||  || — || January 15, 2001 || Socorro || LINEAR || — || align=right | 1.5 km || 
|-id=314 bgcolor=#E9E9E9
| 337314 ||  || — || January 18, 2001 || Socorro || LINEAR || — || align=right | 2.0 km || 
|-id=315 bgcolor=#E9E9E9
| 337315 ||  || — || January 18, 2001 || Socorro || LINEAR || — || align=right | 3.0 km || 
|-id=316 bgcolor=#E9E9E9
| 337316 ||  || — || January 21, 2001 || Socorro || LINEAR || — || align=right | 1.8 km || 
|-id=317 bgcolor=#E9E9E9
| 337317 ||  || — || January 19, 2001 || Socorro || LINEAR || — || align=right | 1.4 km || 
|-id=318 bgcolor=#E9E9E9
| 337318 ||  || — || January 20, 2001 || Socorro || LINEAR || — || align=right | 1.4 km || 
|-id=319 bgcolor=#E9E9E9
| 337319 ||  || — || January 29, 2001 || Oaxaca || J. M. Roe || — || align=right | 2.1 km || 
|-id=320 bgcolor=#E9E9E9
| 337320 ||  || — || January 30, 2001 || Junk Bond || Junk Bond Obs. || EUN || align=right | 2.1 km || 
|-id=321 bgcolor=#E9E9E9
| 337321 ||  || — || January 26, 2001 || Socorro || LINEAR || JUN || align=right | 2.1 km || 
|-id=322 bgcolor=#E9E9E9
| 337322 ||  || — || February 1, 2001 || Socorro || LINEAR || — || align=right | 1.6 km || 
|-id=323 bgcolor=#fefefe
| 337323 ||  || — || February 1, 2001 || Socorro || LINEAR || — || align=right | 1.0 km || 
|-id=324 bgcolor=#E9E9E9
| 337324 ||  || — || February 13, 2001 || Kitt Peak || Spacewatch || WIT || align=right | 1.0 km || 
|-id=325 bgcolor=#E9E9E9
| 337325 || 2001 DF || — || February 16, 2001 || Črni Vrh || Črni Vrh || — || align=right | 2.0 km || 
|-id=326 bgcolor=#E9E9E9
| 337326 ||  || — || February 17, 2001 || Socorro || LINEAR || — || align=right | 1.6 km || 
|-id=327 bgcolor=#E9E9E9
| 337327 ||  || — || February 17, 2001 || Socorro || LINEAR || EUN || align=right | 1.4 km || 
|-id=328 bgcolor=#FA8072
| 337328 ||  || — || February 19, 2001 || Socorro || LINEAR || — || align=right | 1.4 km || 
|-id=329 bgcolor=#E9E9E9
| 337329 ||  || — || February 16, 2001 || Kitt Peak || Spacewatch || — || align=right | 1.4 km || 
|-id=330 bgcolor=#d6d6d6
| 337330 ||  || — || February 16, 2001 || Kitt Peak || Spacewatch || — || align=right | 2.0 km || 
|-id=331 bgcolor=#E9E9E9
| 337331 ||  || — || February 19, 2001 || Socorro || LINEAR || JUN || align=right | 1.3 km || 
|-id=332 bgcolor=#E9E9E9
| 337332 ||  || — || February 22, 2001 || Kitt Peak || Spacewatch || — || align=right | 1.9 km || 
|-id=333 bgcolor=#E9E9E9
| 337333 ||  || — || March 2, 2001 || Anderson Mesa || LONEOS || RAF || align=right | 1.4 km || 
|-id=334 bgcolor=#E9E9E9
| 337334 ||  || — || March 2, 2001 || Anderson Mesa || LONEOS || — || align=right | 2.1 km || 
|-id=335 bgcolor=#E9E9E9
| 337335 ||  || — || March 14, 2001 || Anderson Mesa || LONEOS || HNS || align=right | 1.8 km || 
|-id=336 bgcolor=#E9E9E9
| 337336 ||  || — || March 19, 2001 || Anderson Mesa || LONEOS || JUN || align=right | 1.2 km || 
|-id=337 bgcolor=#E9E9E9
| 337337 ||  || — || March 19, 2001 || Anderson Mesa || LONEOS || — || align=right | 2.1 km || 
|-id=338 bgcolor=#E9E9E9
| 337338 ||  || — || March 18, 2001 || Socorro || LINEAR || JUN || align=right | 1.5 km || 
|-id=339 bgcolor=#E9E9E9
| 337339 ||  || — || March 23, 2001 || Junk Bond || D. Healy || — || align=right | 3.2 km || 
|-id=340 bgcolor=#E9E9E9
| 337340 ||  || — || March 23, 2001 || Socorro || LINEAR || POS || align=right | 4.1 km || 
|-id=341 bgcolor=#E9E9E9
| 337341 ||  || — || March 19, 2001 || Socorro || LINEAR || — || align=right | 2.2 km || 
|-id=342 bgcolor=#E9E9E9
| 337342 ||  || — || March 20, 2001 || Anderson Mesa || LONEOS || — || align=right | 1.9 km || 
|-id=343 bgcolor=#E9E9E9
| 337343 ||  || — || March 23, 2001 || Anderson Mesa || LONEOS || — || align=right | 1.8 km || 
|-id=344 bgcolor=#E9E9E9
| 337344 ||  || — || March 21, 2001 || Kitt Peak || SKADS || WIT || align=right | 1.1 km || 
|-id=345 bgcolor=#FFC2E0
| 337345 ||  || — || May 23, 2001 || Socorro || LINEAR || AMO || align=right data-sort-value="0.27" | 270 m || 
|-id=346 bgcolor=#fefefe
| 337346 ||  || — || June 15, 2001 || Palomar || NEAT || — || align=right | 1.3 km || 
|-id=347 bgcolor=#d6d6d6
| 337347 ||  || — || June 28, 2001 || Haleakala || NEAT || THB || align=right | 4.0 km || 
|-id=348 bgcolor=#d6d6d6
| 337348 ||  || — || July 21, 2001 || Palomar || NEAT || — || align=right | 4.5 km || 
|-id=349 bgcolor=#fefefe
| 337349 ||  || — || July 19, 2001 || Palomar || NEAT || FLO || align=right data-sort-value="0.71" | 710 m || 
|-id=350 bgcolor=#fefefe
| 337350 ||  || — || July 19, 2001 || Palomar || NEAT || — || align=right | 1.1 km || 
|-id=351 bgcolor=#fefefe
| 337351 ||  || — || July 20, 2001 || Palomar || NEAT || — || align=right data-sort-value="0.86" | 860 m || 
|-id=352 bgcolor=#d6d6d6
| 337352 ||  || — || July 21, 2001 || Palomar || NEAT || — || align=right | 3.6 km || 
|-id=353 bgcolor=#d6d6d6
| 337353 ||  || — || July 20, 2001 || Socorro || LINEAR || — || align=right | 5.5 km || 
|-id=354 bgcolor=#fefefe
| 337354 ||  || — || July 30, 2001 || Socorro || LINEAR || FLO || align=right data-sort-value="0.90" | 900 m || 
|-id=355 bgcolor=#fefefe
| 337355 ||  || — || July 26, 2001 || Haleakala || NEAT || NYS || align=right data-sort-value="0.59" | 590 m || 
|-id=356 bgcolor=#fefefe
| 337356 ||  || — || July 22, 2001 || Palomar || NEAT || — || align=right | 1.0 km || 
|-id=357 bgcolor=#fefefe
| 337357 ||  || — || August 5, 2001 || Haleakala || NEAT || H || align=right | 1.3 km || 
|-id=358 bgcolor=#fefefe
| 337358 ||  || — || August 10, 2001 || Palomar || NEAT || — || align=right data-sort-value="0.83" | 830 m || 
|-id=359 bgcolor=#d6d6d6
| 337359 ||  || — || August 9, 2001 || Palomar || NEAT || — || align=right | 3.3 km || 
|-id=360 bgcolor=#fefefe
| 337360 ||  || — || August 9, 2001 || Palomar || NEAT || — || align=right | 1.1 km || 
|-id=361 bgcolor=#d6d6d6
| 337361 ||  || — || August 10, 2001 || Haleakala || NEAT || — || align=right | 3.6 km || 
|-id=362 bgcolor=#d6d6d6
| 337362 ||  || — || August 10, 2001 || Palomar || NEAT || ALA || align=right | 4.1 km || 
|-id=363 bgcolor=#fefefe
| 337363 ||  || — || August 10, 2001 || Palomar || NEAT || — || align=right data-sort-value="0.98" | 980 m || 
|-id=364 bgcolor=#d6d6d6
| 337364 ||  || — || August 11, 2001 || Palomar || NEAT || — || align=right | 3.7 km || 
|-id=365 bgcolor=#fefefe
| 337365 ||  || — || August 11, 2001 || Palomar || NEAT || H || align=right data-sort-value="0.80" | 800 m || 
|-id=366 bgcolor=#fefefe
| 337366 ||  || — || August 11, 2001 || Palomar || NEAT || — || align=right | 1.3 km || 
|-id=367 bgcolor=#d6d6d6
| 337367 ||  || — || June 17, 2001 || Palomar || NEAT || — || align=right | 3.2 km || 
|-id=368 bgcolor=#d6d6d6
| 337368 ||  || — || August 14, 2001 || Haleakala || NEAT || — || align=right | 4.2 km || 
|-id=369 bgcolor=#fefefe
| 337369 ||  || — || August 14, 2001 || Haleakala || NEAT || — || align=right data-sort-value="0.94" | 940 m || 
|-id=370 bgcolor=#fefefe
| 337370 ||  || — || August 13, 2001 || Haleakala || NEAT || FLO || align=right data-sort-value="0.80" | 800 m || 
|-id=371 bgcolor=#FA8072
| 337371 ||  || — || August 16, 2001 || Socorro || LINEAR || — || align=right | 1.0 km || 
|-id=372 bgcolor=#FA8072
| 337372 ||  || — || August 16, 2001 || Socorro || LINEAR || — || align=right | 1.1 km || 
|-id=373 bgcolor=#fefefe
| 337373 ||  || — || August 16, 2001 || Socorro || LINEAR || V || align=right data-sort-value="0.80" | 800 m || 
|-id=374 bgcolor=#fefefe
| 337374 ||  || — || August 16, 2001 || Socorro || LINEAR || NYS || align=right data-sort-value="0.83" | 830 m || 
|-id=375 bgcolor=#fefefe
| 337375 ||  || — || August 16, 2001 || Socorro || LINEAR || — || align=right data-sort-value="0.96" | 960 m || 
|-id=376 bgcolor=#fefefe
| 337376 ||  || — || August 16, 2001 || Socorro || LINEAR || — || align=right | 1.3 km || 
|-id=377 bgcolor=#fefefe
| 337377 ||  || — || August 16, 2001 || Socorro || LINEAR || — || align=right data-sort-value="0.94" | 940 m || 
|-id=378 bgcolor=#fefefe
| 337378 ||  || — || August 19, 2001 || Socorro || LINEAR || — || align=right | 1.1 km || 
|-id=379 bgcolor=#d6d6d6
| 337379 ||  || — || August 19, 2001 || Socorro || LINEAR || — || align=right | 3.1 km || 
|-id=380 bgcolor=#fefefe
| 337380 Lenormand ||  ||  || August 17, 2001 || Pises || M. Ory || MAS || align=right data-sort-value="0.88" | 880 m || 
|-id=381 bgcolor=#d6d6d6
| 337381 ||  || — || August 16, 2001 || Palomar || NEAT || TIR || align=right | 4.2 km || 
|-id=382 bgcolor=#fefefe
| 337382 ||  || — || August 22, 2001 || Socorro || LINEAR || H || align=right data-sort-value="0.68" | 680 m || 
|-id=383 bgcolor=#fefefe
| 337383 ||  || — || August 16, 2001 || Palomar || NEAT || H || align=right data-sort-value="0.79" | 790 m || 
|-id=384 bgcolor=#d6d6d6
| 337384 ||  || — || August 24, 2001 || Ondřejov || P. Pravec, P. Kušnirák || — || align=right | 3.8 km || 
|-id=385 bgcolor=#d6d6d6
| 337385 ||  || — || August 17, 2001 || Socorro || LINEAR || — || align=right | 4.5 km || 
|-id=386 bgcolor=#fefefe
| 337386 ||  || — || August 21, 2001 || Kitt Peak || Spacewatch || MAS || align=right data-sort-value="0.61" | 610 m || 
|-id=387 bgcolor=#fefefe
| 337387 ||  || — || August 24, 2001 || Kitt Peak || Spacewatch || MAS || align=right data-sort-value="0.92" | 920 m || 
|-id=388 bgcolor=#fefefe
| 337388 ||  || — || August 25, 2001 || Kitt Peak || Spacewatch || MAS || align=right data-sort-value="0.82" | 820 m || 
|-id=389 bgcolor=#fefefe
| 337389 ||  || — || August 25, 2001 || Kitt Peak || Spacewatch || MAS || align=right data-sort-value="0.68" | 680 m || 
|-id=390 bgcolor=#fefefe
| 337390 ||  || — || August 25, 2001 || Socorro || LINEAR || H || align=right data-sort-value="0.66" | 660 m || 
|-id=391 bgcolor=#d6d6d6
| 337391 ||  || — || August 23, 2001 || Anderson Mesa || LONEOS || — || align=right | 3.7 km || 
|-id=392 bgcolor=#fefefe
| 337392 ||  || — || August 23, 2001 || Anderson Mesa || LONEOS || NYS || align=right data-sort-value="0.81" | 810 m || 
|-id=393 bgcolor=#d6d6d6
| 337393 ||  || — || August 31, 2001 || Desert Eagle || W. K. Y. Yeung || THB || align=right | 4.3 km || 
|-id=394 bgcolor=#fefefe
| 337394 ||  || — || August 24, 2001 || Haleakala || NEAT || V || align=right data-sort-value="0.92" | 920 m || 
|-id=395 bgcolor=#fefefe
| 337395 ||  || — || August 24, 2001 || Haleakala || NEAT || V || align=right data-sort-value="0.72" | 720 m || 
|-id=396 bgcolor=#fefefe
| 337396 ||  || — || August 24, 2001 || Haleakala || NEAT || V || align=right data-sort-value="0.87" | 870 m || 
|-id=397 bgcolor=#d6d6d6
| 337397 ||  || — || August 22, 2001 || Bergisch Gladbac || W. Bickel || — || align=right | 4.1 km || 
|-id=398 bgcolor=#d6d6d6
| 337398 ||  || — || August 21, 2001 || Socorro || LINEAR || — || align=right | 5.0 km || 
|-id=399 bgcolor=#fefefe
| 337399 ||  || — || August 21, 2001 || Kitt Peak || Spacewatch || NYS || align=right data-sort-value="0.81" | 810 m || 
|-id=400 bgcolor=#d6d6d6
| 337400 ||  || — || August 21, 2001 || Kitt Peak || Spacewatch || — || align=right | 3.8 km || 
|}

337401–337500 

|-bgcolor=#d6d6d6
| 337401 ||  || — || August 22, 2001 || Socorro || LINEAR || — || align=right | 5.1 km || 
|-id=402 bgcolor=#fefefe
| 337402 ||  || — || August 22, 2001 || Kitt Peak || Spacewatch || — || align=right data-sort-value="0.90" | 900 m || 
|-id=403 bgcolor=#fefefe
| 337403 ||  || — || August 23, 2001 || Anderson Mesa || LONEOS || NYS || align=right data-sort-value="0.76" | 760 m || 
|-id=404 bgcolor=#fefefe
| 337404 ||  || — || August 23, 2001 || Anderson Mesa || LONEOS || V || align=right data-sort-value="0.74" | 740 m || 
|-id=405 bgcolor=#d6d6d6
| 337405 ||  || — || August 24, 2001 || Palomar || NEAT || — || align=right | 3.9 km || 
|-id=406 bgcolor=#fefefe
| 337406 ||  || — || August 24, 2001 || Anderson Mesa || LONEOS || — || align=right | 1.2 km || 
|-id=407 bgcolor=#d6d6d6
| 337407 ||  || — || August 24, 2001 || Socorro || LINEAR || — || align=right | 3.1 km || 
|-id=408 bgcolor=#d6d6d6
| 337408 ||  || — || August 24, 2001 || Socorro || LINEAR || — || align=right | 3.3 km || 
|-id=409 bgcolor=#fefefe
| 337409 ||  || — || August 24, 2001 || Socorro || LINEAR || — || align=right | 1.2 km || 
|-id=410 bgcolor=#fefefe
| 337410 ||  || — || August 25, 2001 || Socorro || LINEAR || NYS || align=right data-sort-value="0.85" | 850 m || 
|-id=411 bgcolor=#fefefe
| 337411 ||  || — || August 25, 2001 || Anderson Mesa || LONEOS || — || align=right | 1.1 km || 
|-id=412 bgcolor=#d6d6d6
| 337412 ||  || — || August 25, 2001 || Socorro || LINEAR || — || align=right | 3.6 km || 
|-id=413 bgcolor=#fefefe
| 337413 ||  || — || August 25, 2001 || Socorro || LINEAR || V || align=right | 1.1 km || 
|-id=414 bgcolor=#fefefe
| 337414 ||  || — || August 20, 2001 || Socorro || LINEAR || critical || align=right data-sort-value="0.78" | 780 m || 
|-id=415 bgcolor=#d6d6d6
| 337415 ||  || — || August 19, 2001 || Socorro || LINEAR || — || align=right | 4.1 km || 
|-id=416 bgcolor=#d6d6d6
| 337416 ||  || — || August 18, 2001 || Anderson Mesa || LONEOS || — || align=right | 4.0 km || 
|-id=417 bgcolor=#fefefe
| 337417 ||  || — || August 23, 2001 || Goodricke-Pigott || R. A. Tucker || — || align=right | 1.2 km || 
|-id=418 bgcolor=#fefefe
| 337418 ||  || — || August 16, 2001 || Palomar || NEAT || — || align=right | 1.1 km || 
|-id=419 bgcolor=#fefefe
| 337419 ||  || — || August 23, 2001 || Haleakala || NEAT || NYS || align=right data-sort-value="0.79" | 790 m || 
|-id=420 bgcolor=#C2FFFF
| 337420 ||  || — || August 25, 2001 || Socorro || LINEAR || L5ENM || align=right | 16 km || 
|-id=421 bgcolor=#d6d6d6
| 337421 ||  || — || August 26, 2001 || Palomar || NEAT || HYG || align=right | 3.1 km || 
|-id=422 bgcolor=#d6d6d6
| 337422 ||  || — || September 7, 2001 || Socorro || LINEAR || URS || align=right | 4.5 km || 
|-id=423 bgcolor=#d6d6d6
| 337423 ||  || — || September 7, 2001 || Socorro || LINEAR || — || align=right | 3.2 km || 
|-id=424 bgcolor=#fefefe
| 337424 ||  || — || September 8, 2001 || Socorro || LINEAR || ERI || align=right | 1.6 km || 
|-id=425 bgcolor=#fefefe
| 337425 ||  || — || September 10, 2001 || Socorro || LINEAR || H || align=right data-sort-value="0.67" | 670 m || 
|-id=426 bgcolor=#fefefe
| 337426 ||  || — || September 10, 2001 || Desert Eagle || W. K. Y. Yeung || — || align=right | 1.2 km || 
|-id=427 bgcolor=#fefefe
| 337427 ||  || — || September 10, 2001 || Socorro || LINEAR || PHO || align=right | 1.6 km || 
|-id=428 bgcolor=#d6d6d6
| 337428 ||  || — || September 10, 2001 || Socorro || LINEAR || LIX || align=right | 3.4 km || 
|-id=429 bgcolor=#fefefe
| 337429 ||  || — || September 10, 2001 || San Marcello || A. Boattini, L. Tesi || NYS || align=right data-sort-value="0.69" | 690 m || 
|-id=430 bgcolor=#fefefe
| 337430 ||  || — || September 7, 2001 || Socorro || LINEAR || NYS || align=right data-sort-value="0.65" | 650 m || 
|-id=431 bgcolor=#d6d6d6
| 337431 ||  || — || September 7, 2001 || Socorro || LINEAR || — || align=right | 4.2 km || 
|-id=432 bgcolor=#fefefe
| 337432 ||  || — || September 7, 2001 || Socorro || LINEAR || NYS || align=right data-sort-value="0.89" | 890 m || 
|-id=433 bgcolor=#fefefe
| 337433 ||  || — || September 7, 2001 || Socorro || LINEAR || MAS || align=right data-sort-value="0.78" | 780 m || 
|-id=434 bgcolor=#fefefe
| 337434 ||  || — || September 7, 2001 || Socorro || LINEAR || — || align=right data-sort-value="0.90" | 900 m || 
|-id=435 bgcolor=#d6d6d6
| 337435 ||  || — || September 8, 2001 || Socorro || LINEAR || — || align=right | 3.6 km || 
|-id=436 bgcolor=#d6d6d6
| 337436 ||  || — || September 10, 2001 || Socorro || LINEAR || THM || align=right | 2.4 km || 
|-id=437 bgcolor=#fefefe
| 337437 ||  || — || September 11, 2001 || Socorro || LINEAR || — || align=right | 1.1 km || 
|-id=438 bgcolor=#fefefe
| 337438 ||  || — || September 11, 2001 || Socorro || LINEAR || — || align=right data-sort-value="0.89" | 890 m || 
|-id=439 bgcolor=#fefefe
| 337439 ||  || — || September 10, 2001 || Desert Eagle || W. K. Y. Yeung || — || align=right data-sort-value="0.92" | 920 m || 
|-id=440 bgcolor=#fefefe
| 337440 ||  || — || September 12, 2001 || Socorro || LINEAR || H || align=right data-sort-value="0.59" | 590 m || 
|-id=441 bgcolor=#d6d6d6
| 337441 ||  || — || September 11, 2001 || Socorro || LINEAR || — || align=right | 4.6 km || 
|-id=442 bgcolor=#d6d6d6
| 337442 ||  || — || September 10, 2001 || Socorro || LINEAR || — || align=right | 3.3 km || 
|-id=443 bgcolor=#fefefe
| 337443 ||  || — || September 12, 2001 || Socorro || LINEAR || MAS || align=right data-sort-value="0.95" | 950 m || 
|-id=444 bgcolor=#d6d6d6
| 337444 ||  || — || September 12, 2001 || Socorro || LINEAR || — || align=right | 3.4 km || 
|-id=445 bgcolor=#fefefe
| 337445 ||  || — || September 12, 2001 || Socorro || LINEAR || MAS || align=right data-sort-value="0.90" | 900 m || 
|-id=446 bgcolor=#d6d6d6
| 337446 ||  || — || September 12, 2001 || Socorro || LINEAR || — || align=right | 3.5 km || 
|-id=447 bgcolor=#d6d6d6
| 337447 ||  || — || September 12, 2001 || Socorro || LINEAR || — || align=right | 4.0 km || 
|-id=448 bgcolor=#fefefe
| 337448 ||  || — || September 12, 2001 || Socorro || LINEAR || NYS || align=right data-sort-value="0.88" | 880 m || 
|-id=449 bgcolor=#fefefe
| 337449 ||  || — || September 14, 2001 || Palomar || NEAT || — || align=right | 1.1 km || 
|-id=450 bgcolor=#fefefe
| 337450 ||  || — || September 14, 2001 || Palomar || NEAT || — || align=right | 1.2 km || 
|-id=451 bgcolor=#d6d6d6
| 337451 ||  || — || September 11, 2001 || Anderson Mesa || LONEOS || — || align=right | 5.8 km || 
|-id=452 bgcolor=#d6d6d6
| 337452 ||  || — || September 11, 2001 || Anderson Mesa || LONEOS || — || align=right | 3.9 km || 
|-id=453 bgcolor=#d6d6d6
| 337453 ||  || — || September 11, 2001 || Anderson Mesa || LONEOS || — || align=right | 3.6 km || 
|-id=454 bgcolor=#fefefe
| 337454 ||  || — || August 17, 2001 || Socorro || LINEAR || PHO || align=right | 1.1 km || 
|-id=455 bgcolor=#fefefe
| 337455 ||  || — || September 11, 2001 || Anderson Mesa || LONEOS || MAS || align=right data-sort-value="0.93" | 930 m || 
|-id=456 bgcolor=#fefefe
| 337456 ||  || — || September 12, 2001 || Kitt Peak || Spacewatch || — || align=right data-sort-value="0.62" | 620 m || 
|-id=457 bgcolor=#fefefe
| 337457 ||  || — || September 12, 2001 || Kitt Peak || Spacewatch || V || align=right data-sort-value="0.69" | 690 m || 
|-id=458 bgcolor=#fefefe
| 337458 ||  || — || September 12, 2001 || Socorro || LINEAR || ERI || align=right | 1.8 km || 
|-id=459 bgcolor=#fefefe
| 337459 ||  || — || September 12, 2001 || Socorro || LINEAR || MAS || align=right data-sort-value="0.79" | 790 m || 
|-id=460 bgcolor=#fefefe
| 337460 ||  || — || September 12, 2001 || Socorro || LINEAR || V || align=right data-sort-value="0.73" | 730 m || 
|-id=461 bgcolor=#fefefe
| 337461 ||  || — || August 12, 2001 || Palomar || NEAT || — || align=right data-sort-value="0.97" | 970 m || 
|-id=462 bgcolor=#fefefe
| 337462 ||  || — || September 12, 2001 || Socorro || LINEAR || MAS || align=right data-sort-value="0.99" | 990 m || 
|-id=463 bgcolor=#d6d6d6
| 337463 ||  || — || September 12, 2001 || Socorro || LINEAR || — || align=right | 3.0 km || 
|-id=464 bgcolor=#fefefe
| 337464 ||  || — || September 12, 2001 || Socorro || LINEAR || NYS || align=right data-sort-value="0.74" | 740 m || 
|-id=465 bgcolor=#d6d6d6
| 337465 ||  || — || September 12, 2001 || Socorro || LINEAR || — || align=right | 3.2 km || 
|-id=466 bgcolor=#fefefe
| 337466 ||  || — || September 12, 2001 || Socorro || LINEAR || — || align=right data-sort-value="0.79" | 790 m || 
|-id=467 bgcolor=#d6d6d6
| 337467 ||  || — || September 12, 2001 || Socorro || LINEAR || — || align=right | 3.4 km || 
|-id=468 bgcolor=#fefefe
| 337468 ||  || — || September 8, 2001 || Socorro || LINEAR || — || align=right data-sort-value="0.70" | 700 m || 
|-id=469 bgcolor=#fefefe
| 337469 ||  || — || September 11, 2001 || Socorro || LINEAR || — || align=right | 1.2 km || 
|-id=470 bgcolor=#d6d6d6
| 337470 ||  || — || September 18, 2001 || Kitt Peak || Spacewatch || CRO || align=right | 4.9 km || 
|-id=471 bgcolor=#fefefe
| 337471 ||  || — || September 16, 2001 || Socorro || LINEAR || — || align=right | 1.1 km || 
|-id=472 bgcolor=#fefefe
| 337472 ||  || — || September 16, 2001 || Socorro || LINEAR || — || align=right | 1.2 km || 
|-id=473 bgcolor=#fefefe
| 337473 ||  || — || September 16, 2001 || Socorro || LINEAR || MAS || align=right data-sort-value="0.77" | 770 m || 
|-id=474 bgcolor=#fefefe
| 337474 ||  || — || September 16, 2001 || Socorro || LINEAR || MAS || align=right data-sort-value="0.76" | 760 m || 
|-id=475 bgcolor=#d6d6d6
| 337475 ||  || — || September 16, 2001 || Socorro || LINEAR || — || align=right | 3.9 km || 
|-id=476 bgcolor=#fefefe
| 337476 ||  || — || September 16, 2001 || Socorro || LINEAR || — || align=right data-sort-value="0.89" | 890 m || 
|-id=477 bgcolor=#fefefe
| 337477 ||  || — || September 16, 2001 || Socorro || LINEAR || — || align=right | 2.8 km || 
|-id=478 bgcolor=#d6d6d6
| 337478 ||  || — || August 16, 2001 || Socorro || LINEAR || TIR || align=right | 3.1 km || 
|-id=479 bgcolor=#fefefe
| 337479 ||  || — || August 24, 2001 || Socorro || LINEAR || ERI || align=right | 2.4 km || 
|-id=480 bgcolor=#d6d6d6
| 337480 ||  || — || September 17, 2001 || Socorro || LINEAR || — || align=right | 3.6 km || 
|-id=481 bgcolor=#d6d6d6
| 337481 ||  || — || September 17, 2001 || Socorro || LINEAR || — || align=right | 4.6 km || 
|-id=482 bgcolor=#fefefe
| 337482 ||  || — || September 16, 2001 || Socorro || LINEAR || — || align=right data-sort-value="0.84" | 840 m || 
|-id=483 bgcolor=#fefefe
| 337483 ||  || — || September 17, 2001 || Socorro || LINEAR || — || align=right | 1.3 km || 
|-id=484 bgcolor=#d6d6d6
| 337484 ||  || — || September 20, 2001 || Socorro || LINEAR || EOS || align=right | 2.3 km || 
|-id=485 bgcolor=#fefefe
| 337485 ||  || — || September 20, 2001 || Socorro || LINEAR || — || align=right data-sort-value="0.86" | 860 m || 
|-id=486 bgcolor=#d6d6d6
| 337486 ||  || — || September 20, 2001 || Socorro || LINEAR || — || align=right | 4.9 km || 
|-id=487 bgcolor=#d6d6d6
| 337487 ||  || — || September 20, 2001 || Socorro || LINEAR || — || align=right | 3.4 km || 
|-id=488 bgcolor=#d6d6d6
| 337488 ||  || — || September 20, 2001 || Socorro || LINEAR || — || align=right | 4.2 km || 
|-id=489 bgcolor=#d6d6d6
| 337489 ||  || — || September 20, 2001 || Socorro || LINEAR || — || align=right | 4.3 km || 
|-id=490 bgcolor=#d6d6d6
| 337490 ||  || — || September 20, 2001 || Socorro || LINEAR || — || align=right | 4.4 km || 
|-id=491 bgcolor=#d6d6d6
| 337491 ||  || — || September 20, 2001 || Socorro || LINEAR || EOS || align=right | 2.4 km || 
|-id=492 bgcolor=#fefefe
| 337492 ||  || — || September 20, 2001 || Socorro || LINEAR || — || align=right | 1.3 km || 
|-id=493 bgcolor=#fefefe
| 337493 ||  || — || September 20, 2001 || Socorro || LINEAR || — || align=right | 1.2 km || 
|-id=494 bgcolor=#fefefe
| 337494 ||  || — || September 20, 2001 || Socorro || LINEAR || — || align=right data-sort-value="0.83" | 830 m || 
|-id=495 bgcolor=#d6d6d6
| 337495 ||  || — || September 20, 2001 || Socorro || LINEAR || HYG || align=right | 2.7 km || 
|-id=496 bgcolor=#d6d6d6
| 337496 ||  || — || September 20, 2001 || Socorro || LINEAR || — || align=right | 4.5 km || 
|-id=497 bgcolor=#fefefe
| 337497 ||  || — || September 20, 2001 || Socorro || LINEAR || — || align=right data-sort-value="0.90" | 900 m || 
|-id=498 bgcolor=#d6d6d6
| 337498 ||  || — || September 20, 2001 || Socorro || LINEAR || — || align=right | 3.4 km || 
|-id=499 bgcolor=#fefefe
| 337499 ||  || — || September 16, 2001 || Socorro || LINEAR || — || align=right data-sort-value="0.92" | 920 m || 
|-id=500 bgcolor=#d6d6d6
| 337500 ||  || — || September 16, 2001 || Socorro || LINEAR || EOS || align=right | 2.7 km || 
|}

337501–337600 

|-bgcolor=#fefefe
| 337501 ||  || — || September 16, 2001 || Socorro || LINEAR || — || align=right | 1.2 km || 
|-id=502 bgcolor=#d6d6d6
| 337502 ||  || — || September 16, 2001 || Socorro || LINEAR || EOS || align=right | 2.5 km || 
|-id=503 bgcolor=#fefefe
| 337503 ||  || — || September 16, 2001 || Socorro || LINEAR || — || align=right | 1.2 km || 
|-id=504 bgcolor=#fefefe
| 337504 ||  || — || September 16, 2001 || Socorro || LINEAR || NYS || align=right data-sort-value="0.63" | 630 m || 
|-id=505 bgcolor=#d6d6d6
| 337505 ||  || — || September 16, 2001 || Socorro || LINEAR || EUP || align=right | 4.7 km || 
|-id=506 bgcolor=#d6d6d6
| 337506 ||  || — || September 16, 2001 || Socorro || LINEAR || EMA || align=right | 3.9 km || 
|-id=507 bgcolor=#d6d6d6
| 337507 ||  || — || September 16, 2001 || Socorro || LINEAR || EOS || align=right | 2.9 km || 
|-id=508 bgcolor=#fefefe
| 337508 ||  || — || September 16, 2001 || Socorro || LINEAR || V || align=right data-sort-value="0.87" | 870 m || 
|-id=509 bgcolor=#d6d6d6
| 337509 ||  || — || September 16, 2001 || Socorro || LINEAR || EUP || align=right | 3.6 km || 
|-id=510 bgcolor=#d6d6d6
| 337510 ||  || — || September 16, 2001 || Socorro || LINEAR || EOS || align=right | 2.7 km || 
|-id=511 bgcolor=#d6d6d6
| 337511 ||  || — || September 16, 2001 || Socorro || LINEAR || — || align=right | 3.9 km || 
|-id=512 bgcolor=#d6d6d6
| 337512 ||  || — || September 16, 2001 || Socorro || LINEAR || HYG || align=right | 3.3 km || 
|-id=513 bgcolor=#d6d6d6
| 337513 ||  || — || September 16, 2001 || Socorro || LINEAR || — || align=right | 3.1 km || 
|-id=514 bgcolor=#fefefe
| 337514 ||  || — || September 16, 2001 || Socorro || LINEAR || MAS || align=right data-sort-value="0.78" | 780 m || 
|-id=515 bgcolor=#fefefe
| 337515 ||  || — || September 16, 2001 || Socorro || LINEAR || NYScritical || align=right data-sort-value="0.55" | 550 m || 
|-id=516 bgcolor=#fefefe
| 337516 ||  || — || September 17, 2001 || Socorro || LINEAR || — || align=right | 1.3 km || 
|-id=517 bgcolor=#fefefe
| 337517 ||  || — || September 17, 2001 || Socorro || LINEAR || H || align=right data-sort-value="0.66" | 660 m || 
|-id=518 bgcolor=#d6d6d6
| 337518 ||  || — || September 17, 2001 || Socorro || LINEAR || TIR || align=right | 4.1 km || 
|-id=519 bgcolor=#d6d6d6
| 337519 ||  || — || September 17, 2001 || Socorro || LINEAR || — || align=right | 2.9 km || 
|-id=520 bgcolor=#d6d6d6
| 337520 ||  || — || September 17, 2001 || Socorro || LINEAR || EUP || align=right | 3.9 km || 
|-id=521 bgcolor=#fefefe
| 337521 ||  || — || September 17, 2001 || Socorro || LINEAR || — || align=right | 1.1 km || 
|-id=522 bgcolor=#d6d6d6
| 337522 ||  || — || September 17, 2001 || Socorro || LINEAR || — || align=right | 3.8 km || 
|-id=523 bgcolor=#fefefe
| 337523 ||  || — || September 19, 2001 || Socorro || LINEAR || MAS || align=right data-sort-value="0.82" | 820 m || 
|-id=524 bgcolor=#fefefe
| 337524 ||  || — || September 19, 2001 || Socorro || LINEAR || MAS || align=right | 1.0 km || 
|-id=525 bgcolor=#fefefe
| 337525 ||  || — || September 16, 2001 || Socorro || LINEAR || V || align=right data-sort-value="0.91" | 910 m || 
|-id=526 bgcolor=#fefefe
| 337526 ||  || — || September 16, 2001 || Socorro || LINEAR || — || align=right | 1.2 km || 
|-id=527 bgcolor=#d6d6d6
| 337527 ||  || — || September 16, 2001 || Socorro || LINEAR || TIR || align=right | 4.0 km || 
|-id=528 bgcolor=#d6d6d6
| 337528 ||  || — || September 17, 2001 || Socorro || LINEAR || — || align=right | 2.8 km || 
|-id=529 bgcolor=#fefefe
| 337529 ||  || — || September 19, 2001 || Socorro || LINEAR || NYS || align=right data-sort-value="0.74" | 740 m || 
|-id=530 bgcolor=#d6d6d6
| 337530 ||  || — || September 19, 2001 || Socorro || LINEAR || — || align=right | 4.1 km || 
|-id=531 bgcolor=#fefefe
| 337531 ||  || — || September 19, 2001 || Socorro || LINEAR || NYS || align=right data-sort-value="0.73" | 730 m || 
|-id=532 bgcolor=#fefefe
| 337532 ||  || — || September 19, 2001 || Socorro || LINEAR || MAS || align=right data-sort-value="0.91" | 910 m || 
|-id=533 bgcolor=#d6d6d6
| 337533 ||  || — || September 19, 2001 || Socorro || LINEAR || ALA || align=right | 3.8 km || 
|-id=534 bgcolor=#fefefe
| 337534 ||  || — || September 19, 2001 || Socorro || LINEAR || NYS || align=right data-sort-value="0.81" | 810 m || 
|-id=535 bgcolor=#d6d6d6
| 337535 ||  || — || September 19, 2001 || Socorro || LINEAR || — || align=right | 3.1 km || 
|-id=536 bgcolor=#fefefe
| 337536 ||  || — || September 19, 2001 || Socorro || LINEAR || — || align=right | 1.1 km || 
|-id=537 bgcolor=#fefefe
| 337537 ||  || — || September 19, 2001 || Socorro || LINEAR || — || align=right | 1.2 km || 
|-id=538 bgcolor=#d6d6d6
| 337538 ||  || — || September 19, 2001 || Socorro || LINEAR || THM || align=right | 2.4 km || 
|-id=539 bgcolor=#fefefe
| 337539 ||  || — || September 19, 2001 || Socorro || LINEAR || — || align=right data-sort-value="0.99" | 990 m || 
|-id=540 bgcolor=#fefefe
| 337540 ||  || — || September 19, 2001 || Socorro || LINEAR || V || align=right data-sort-value="0.79" | 790 m || 
|-id=541 bgcolor=#fefefe
| 337541 ||  || — || September 19, 2001 || Socorro || LINEAR || NYS || align=right data-sort-value="0.76" | 760 m || 
|-id=542 bgcolor=#fefefe
| 337542 ||  || — || September 19, 2001 || Socorro || LINEAR || NYS || align=right data-sort-value="0.77" | 770 m || 
|-id=543 bgcolor=#fefefe
| 337543 ||  || — || September 19, 2001 || Socorro || LINEAR || MAS || align=right data-sort-value="0.93" | 930 m || 
|-id=544 bgcolor=#d6d6d6
| 337544 ||  || — || September 11, 2001 || Kitt Peak || Spacewatch || — || align=right | 2.7 km || 
|-id=545 bgcolor=#fefefe
| 337545 ||  || — || September 17, 2001 || Anderson Mesa || LONEOS || NYS || align=right data-sort-value="0.85" | 850 m || 
|-id=546 bgcolor=#fefefe
| 337546 ||  || — || September 19, 2001 || Socorro || LINEAR || — || align=right | 1.1 km || 
|-id=547 bgcolor=#d6d6d6
| 337547 ||  || — || September 19, 2001 || Socorro || LINEAR || — || align=right | 4.5 km || 
|-id=548 bgcolor=#fefefe
| 337548 ||  || — || September 19, 2001 || Socorro || LINEAR || H || align=right | 1.0 km || 
|-id=549 bgcolor=#fefefe
| 337549 ||  || — || September 19, 2001 || Socorro || LINEAR || MASfast? || align=right data-sort-value="0.93" | 930 m || 
|-id=550 bgcolor=#d6d6d6
| 337550 ||  || — || September 20, 2001 || Socorro || LINEAR || — || align=right | 3.1 km || 
|-id=551 bgcolor=#fefefe
| 337551 ||  || — || September 20, 2001 || Socorro || LINEAR || NYS || align=right data-sort-value="0.77" | 770 m || 
|-id=552 bgcolor=#d6d6d6
| 337552 ||  || — || September 20, 2001 || Socorro || LINEAR || HYG || align=right | 2.8 km || 
|-id=553 bgcolor=#d6d6d6
| 337553 ||  || — || September 20, 2001 || Socorro || LINEAR || — || align=right | 2.6 km || 
|-id=554 bgcolor=#fefefe
| 337554 ||  || — || September 20, 2001 || Socorro || LINEAR || NYS || align=right data-sort-value="0.65" | 650 m || 
|-id=555 bgcolor=#FA8072
| 337555 ||  || — || September 20, 2001 || Socorro || LINEAR || — || align=right data-sort-value="0.93" | 930 m || 
|-id=556 bgcolor=#d6d6d6
| 337556 ||  || — || September 21, 2001 || Socorro || LINEAR || HYG || align=right | 3.0 km || 
|-id=557 bgcolor=#FFC2E0
| 337557 ||  || — || September 21, 2001 || Palomar || NEAT || AMO || align=right data-sort-value="0.71" | 710 m || 
|-id=558 bgcolor=#FFC2E0
| 337558 ||  || — || September 23, 2001 || Palomar || NEAT || APOPHAcritical || align=right data-sort-value="0.49" | 490 m || 
|-id=559 bgcolor=#fefefe
| 337559 ||  || — || September 24, 2001 || Socorro || LINEAR || H || align=right data-sort-value="0.97" | 970 m || 
|-id=560 bgcolor=#d6d6d6
| 337560 ||  || — || September 25, 2001 || Desert Eagle || W. K. Y. Yeung || THM || align=right | 3.2 km || 
|-id=561 bgcolor=#fefefe
| 337561 ||  || — || September 25, 2001 || Desert Eagle || W. K. Y. Yeung || — || align=right | 1.3 km || 
|-id=562 bgcolor=#fefefe
| 337562 ||  || — || September 20, 2001 || Socorro || LINEAR || — || align=right | 1.0 km || 
|-id=563 bgcolor=#d6d6d6
| 337563 ||  || — || September 20, 2001 || Kitt Peak || Spacewatch || — || align=right | 4.5 km || 
|-id=564 bgcolor=#d6d6d6
| 337564 ||  || — || September 22, 2001 || Kitt Peak || Spacewatch || — || align=right | 2.8 km || 
|-id=565 bgcolor=#fefefe
| 337565 ||  || — || September 28, 2001 || Palomar || NEAT || V || align=right data-sort-value="0.68" | 680 m || 
|-id=566 bgcolor=#fefefe
| 337566 ||  || — || September 28, 2001 || Palomar || NEAT || V || align=right data-sort-value="0.80" | 800 m || 
|-id=567 bgcolor=#d6d6d6
| 337567 ||  || — || September 21, 2001 || Anderson Mesa || LONEOS || — || align=right | 4.8 km || 
|-id=568 bgcolor=#d6d6d6
| 337568 ||  || — || September 20, 2001 || Socorro || LINEAR || — || align=right | 3.5 km || 
|-id=569 bgcolor=#fefefe
| 337569 ||  || — || September 20, 2001 || Socorro || LINEAR || — || align=right data-sort-value="0.81" | 810 m || 
|-id=570 bgcolor=#d6d6d6
| 337570 ||  || — || September 20, 2001 || Socorro || LINEAR || — || align=right | 3.4 km || 
|-id=571 bgcolor=#fefefe
| 337571 ||  || — || September 20, 2001 || Socorro || LINEAR || MAS || align=right data-sort-value="0.75" | 750 m || 
|-id=572 bgcolor=#d6d6d6
| 337572 ||  || — || September 25, 2001 || Socorro || LINEAR || — || align=right | 3.1 km || 
|-id=573 bgcolor=#fefefe
| 337573 ||  || — || September 18, 2001 || Anderson Mesa || LONEOS || V || align=right data-sort-value="0.81" | 810 m || 
|-id=574 bgcolor=#fefefe
| 337574 ||  || — || September 25, 2001 || Palomar || NEAT || — || align=right | 1.0 km || 
|-id=575 bgcolor=#d6d6d6
| 337575 ||  || — || September 25, 2001 || Palomar || NEAT || — || align=right | 3.7 km || 
|-id=576 bgcolor=#d6d6d6
| 337576 ||  || — || September 19, 2001 || Socorro || LINEAR || TIR || align=right | 3.2 km || 
|-id=577 bgcolor=#d6d6d6
| 337577 ||  || — || September 21, 2001 || Socorro || LINEAR || — || align=right | 3.5 km || 
|-id=578 bgcolor=#d6d6d6
| 337578 ||  || — || September 25, 2001 || Socorro || LINEAR || — || align=right | 3.8 km || 
|-id=579 bgcolor=#d6d6d6
| 337579 ||  || — || September 25, 2001 || Socorro || LINEAR || — || align=right | 3.6 km || 
|-id=580 bgcolor=#d6d6d6
| 337580 ||  || — || September 17, 2001 || Palomar || NEAT || — || align=right | 3.6 km || 
|-id=581 bgcolor=#d6d6d6
| 337581 ||  || — || September 19, 2001 || Socorro || LINEAR || MEL || align=right | 4.0 km || 
|-id=582 bgcolor=#fefefe
| 337582 ||  || — || September 19, 2001 || Palomar || NEAT || V || align=right data-sort-value="0.78" | 780 m || 
|-id=583 bgcolor=#fefefe
| 337583 ||  || — || September 19, 2001 || Socorro || LINEAR || NYS || align=right data-sort-value="0.74" | 740 m || 
|-id=584 bgcolor=#fefefe
| 337584 ||  || — || September 20, 2001 || Socorro || LINEAR || V || align=right data-sort-value="0.80" | 800 m || 
|-id=585 bgcolor=#fefefe
| 337585 ||  || — || September 20, 2001 || Kitt Peak || Spacewatch || MAS || align=right data-sort-value="0.67" | 670 m || 
|-id=586 bgcolor=#d6d6d6
| 337586 ||  || — || September 21, 2001 || Anderson Mesa || LONEOS || Tj (2.94) || align=right | 7.0 km || 
|-id=587 bgcolor=#d6d6d6
| 337587 ||  || — || September 21, 2001 || Socorro || LINEAR || THM || align=right | 2.3 km || 
|-id=588 bgcolor=#d6d6d6
| 337588 ||  || — || September 21, 2001 || Socorro || LINEAR || HYG || align=right | 2.6 km || 
|-id=589 bgcolor=#FA8072
| 337589 ||  || — || September 21, 2001 || Palomar || NEAT || — || align=right | 1.0 km || 
|-id=590 bgcolor=#fefefe
| 337590 ||  || — || September 25, 2001 || Socorro || LINEAR || — || align=right data-sort-value="0.93" | 930 m || 
|-id=591 bgcolor=#fefefe
| 337591 ||  || — || September 18, 2001 || Anderson Mesa || LONEOS || NYS || align=right data-sort-value="0.78" | 780 m || 
|-id=592 bgcolor=#fefefe
| 337592 ||  || — || September 20, 2001 || Socorro || LINEAR || — || align=right data-sort-value="0.74" | 740 m || 
|-id=593 bgcolor=#d6d6d6
| 337593 ||  || — || September 20, 2001 || Socorro || LINEAR || EOS || align=right | 2.2 km || 
|-id=594 bgcolor=#fefefe
| 337594 ||  || — || September 25, 2001 || Socorro || LINEAR || — || align=right | 1.3 km || 
|-id=595 bgcolor=#fefefe
| 337595 ||  || — || September 26, 2001 || Palomar || NEAT || — || align=right | 1.0 km || 
|-id=596 bgcolor=#fefefe
| 337596 ||  || — || September 21, 2001 || Palomar || NEAT || V || align=right data-sort-value="0.85" | 850 m || 
|-id=597 bgcolor=#d6d6d6
| 337597 ||  || — || July 21, 2010 || WISE || WISE || — || align=right | 3.8 km || 
|-id=598 bgcolor=#fefefe
| 337598 ||  || — || October 8, 2001 || Palomar || NEAT || V || align=right | 1.0 km || 
|-id=599 bgcolor=#d6d6d6
| 337599 ||  || — || October 10, 2001 || Kitt Peak || Spacewatch || — || align=right | 3.5 km || 
|-id=600 bgcolor=#fefefe
| 337600 ||  || — || October 7, 2001 || Palomar || NEAT || MAS || align=right data-sort-value="0.73" | 730 m || 
|}

337601–337700 

|-bgcolor=#fefefe
| 337601 ||  || — || October 7, 2001 || Palomar || NEAT || NYS || align=right data-sort-value="0.80" | 800 m || 
|-id=602 bgcolor=#d6d6d6
| 337602 ||  || — || September 20, 2001 || Desert Eagle || W. K. Y. Yeung || — || align=right | 3.4 km || 
|-id=603 bgcolor=#fefefe
| 337603 ||  || — || October 8, 2001 || Palomar || NEAT || KLI || align=right | 1.6 km || 
|-id=604 bgcolor=#fefefe
| 337604 ||  || — || October 10, 2001 || Palomar || NEAT || V || align=right data-sort-value="0.80" | 800 m || 
|-id=605 bgcolor=#fefefe
| 337605 ||  || — || October 13, 2001 || Socorro || LINEAR || — || align=right | 1.1 km || 
|-id=606 bgcolor=#d6d6d6
| 337606 ||  || — || October 13, 2001 || Socorro || LINEAR || EOS || align=right | 2.8 km || 
|-id=607 bgcolor=#FA8072
| 337607 ||  || — || October 11, 2001 || Socorro || LINEAR || — || align=right | 1.2 km || 
|-id=608 bgcolor=#d6d6d6
| 337608 ||  || — || October 12, 2001 || Ondřejov || P. Kušnirák || — || align=right | 3.9 km || 
|-id=609 bgcolor=#d6d6d6
| 337609 ||  || — || October 6, 2001 || Palomar || NEAT || — || align=right | 5.0 km || 
|-id=610 bgcolor=#d6d6d6
| 337610 ||  || — || October 11, 2001 || Socorro || LINEAR || EOS || align=right | 5.3 km || 
|-id=611 bgcolor=#fefefe
| 337611 ||  || — || October 14, 2001 || Socorro || LINEAR || H || align=right data-sort-value="0.73" | 730 m || 
|-id=612 bgcolor=#d6d6d6
| 337612 ||  || — || October 15, 2001 || Socorro || LINEAR || EUP || align=right | 3.8 km || 
|-id=613 bgcolor=#fefefe
| 337613 ||  || — || October 14, 2001 || Cima Ekar || ADAS || — || align=right | 1.1 km || 
|-id=614 bgcolor=#fefefe
| 337614 ||  || — || October 14, 2001 || Cima Ekar || ADAS || — || align=right data-sort-value="0.94" | 940 m || 
|-id=615 bgcolor=#d6d6d6
| 337615 ||  || — || October 15, 2001 || Desert Eagle || W. K. Y. Yeung || HYG || align=right | 3.4 km || 
|-id=616 bgcolor=#fefefe
| 337616 ||  || — || October 14, 2001 || Socorro || LINEAR || — || align=right | 3.1 km || 
|-id=617 bgcolor=#d6d6d6
| 337617 ||  || — || October 13, 2001 || Socorro || LINEAR || TIR || align=right | 3.8 km || 
|-id=618 bgcolor=#fefefe
| 337618 ||  || — || October 13, 2001 || Socorro || LINEAR || EUT || align=right data-sort-value="0.81" | 810 m || 
|-id=619 bgcolor=#d6d6d6
| 337619 ||  || — || October 13, 2001 || Socorro || LINEAR || — || align=right | 3.9 km || 
|-id=620 bgcolor=#d6d6d6
| 337620 ||  || — || October 13, 2001 || Socorro || LINEAR || MEL || align=right | 3.8 km || 
|-id=621 bgcolor=#d6d6d6
| 337621 ||  || — || October 13, 2001 || Socorro || LINEAR || — || align=right | 3.8 km || 
|-id=622 bgcolor=#d6d6d6
| 337622 ||  || — || October 14, 2001 || Socorro || LINEAR || — || align=right | 4.1 km || 
|-id=623 bgcolor=#fefefe
| 337623 ||  || — || October 14, 2001 || Socorro || LINEAR || — || align=right data-sort-value="0.75" | 750 m || 
|-id=624 bgcolor=#fefefe
| 337624 ||  || — || October 14, 2001 || Socorro || LINEAR || — || align=right | 1.2 km || 
|-id=625 bgcolor=#d6d6d6
| 337625 ||  || — || October 14, 2001 || Socorro || LINEAR || — || align=right | 3.6 km || 
|-id=626 bgcolor=#fefefe
| 337626 ||  || — || October 14, 2001 || Socorro || LINEAR || — || align=right data-sort-value="0.97" | 970 m || 
|-id=627 bgcolor=#d6d6d6
| 337627 ||  || — || October 14, 2001 || Socorro || LINEAR || — || align=right | 3.6 km || 
|-id=628 bgcolor=#fefefe
| 337628 ||  || — || October 14, 2001 || Socorro || LINEAR || V || align=right data-sort-value="0.93" | 930 m || 
|-id=629 bgcolor=#fefefe
| 337629 ||  || — || October 14, 2001 || Socorro || LINEAR || FLO || align=right data-sort-value="0.96" | 960 m || 
|-id=630 bgcolor=#d6d6d6
| 337630 ||  || — || October 14, 2001 || Socorro || LINEAR || — || align=right | 3.5 km || 
|-id=631 bgcolor=#fefefe
| 337631 ||  || — || October 14, 2001 || Socorro || LINEAR || — || align=right data-sort-value="0.86" | 860 m || 
|-id=632 bgcolor=#fefefe
| 337632 ||  || — || October 14, 2001 || Socorro || LINEAR || KLI || align=right | 2.4 km || 
|-id=633 bgcolor=#fefefe
| 337633 ||  || — || October 14, 2001 || Socorro || LINEAR || MAS || align=right data-sort-value="0.90" | 900 m || 
|-id=634 bgcolor=#fefefe
| 337634 ||  || — || October 14, 2001 || Socorro || LINEAR || — || align=right | 1.0 km || 
|-id=635 bgcolor=#fefefe
| 337635 ||  || — || October 13, 2001 || Socorro || LINEAR || NYS || align=right data-sort-value="0.84" | 840 m || 
|-id=636 bgcolor=#fefefe
| 337636 ||  || — || October 14, 2001 || Socorro || LINEAR || — || align=right | 1.1 km || 
|-id=637 bgcolor=#d6d6d6
| 337637 ||  || — || October 14, 2001 || Socorro || LINEAR || — || align=right | 4.0 km || 
|-id=638 bgcolor=#C2FFFF
| 337638 ||  || — || October 14, 2001 || Socorro || LINEAR || L5 || align=right | 15 km || 
|-id=639 bgcolor=#fefefe
| 337639 ||  || — || October 14, 2001 || Socorro || LINEAR || NYS || align=right data-sort-value="0.62" | 620 m || 
|-id=640 bgcolor=#d6d6d6
| 337640 ||  || — || October 14, 2001 || Socorro || LINEAR || — || align=right | 6.1 km || 
|-id=641 bgcolor=#fefefe
| 337641 ||  || — || October 15, 2001 || Socorro || LINEAR || PHO || align=right | 1.5 km || 
|-id=642 bgcolor=#d6d6d6
| 337642 ||  || — || October 15, 2001 || Socorro || LINEAR || — || align=right | 5.2 km || 
|-id=643 bgcolor=#d6d6d6
| 337643 ||  || — || October 15, 2001 || Socorro || LINEAR || — || align=right | 3.7 km || 
|-id=644 bgcolor=#d6d6d6
| 337644 ||  || — || October 15, 2001 || Socorro || LINEAR || — || align=right | 6.7 km || 
|-id=645 bgcolor=#d6d6d6
| 337645 ||  || — || October 12, 2001 || Haleakala || NEAT || — || align=right | 4.3 km || 
|-id=646 bgcolor=#d6d6d6
| 337646 ||  || — || October 12, 2001 || Haleakala || NEAT || — || align=right | 4.8 km || 
|-id=647 bgcolor=#fefefe
| 337647 ||  || — || October 12, 2001 || Haleakala || NEAT || — || align=right | 1.0 km || 
|-id=648 bgcolor=#d6d6d6
| 337648 ||  || — || October 15, 2001 || Kitt Peak || Spacewatch || — || align=right | 2.5 km || 
|-id=649 bgcolor=#fefefe
| 337649 ||  || — || October 15, 2001 || Kitt Peak || Spacewatch || V || align=right data-sort-value="0.70" | 700 m || 
|-id=650 bgcolor=#fefefe
| 337650 ||  || — || October 10, 2001 || Palomar || NEAT || — || align=right | 1.1 km || 
|-id=651 bgcolor=#d6d6d6
| 337651 ||  || — || October 12, 2001 || Haleakala || NEAT || — || align=right | 5.4 km || 
|-id=652 bgcolor=#d6d6d6
| 337652 ||  || — || October 12, 2001 || Haleakala || NEAT || — || align=right | 4.0 km || 
|-id=653 bgcolor=#fefefe
| 337653 ||  || — || October 14, 2001 || Palomar || NEAT || — || align=right | 1.0 km || 
|-id=654 bgcolor=#fefefe
| 337654 ||  || — || October 10, 2001 || Palomar || NEAT || — || align=right | 2.7 km || 
|-id=655 bgcolor=#fefefe
| 337655 ||  || — || October 10, 2001 || Palomar || NEAT || — || align=right data-sort-value="0.97" | 970 m || 
|-id=656 bgcolor=#fefefe
| 337656 ||  || — || October 10, 2001 || Palomar || NEAT || FLO || align=right data-sort-value="0.82" | 820 m || 
|-id=657 bgcolor=#d6d6d6
| 337657 ||  || — || October 10, 2001 || Palomar || NEAT || — || align=right | 4.4 km || 
|-id=658 bgcolor=#fefefe
| 337658 ||  || — || October 13, 2001 || Palomar || NEAT || — || align=right | 1.4 km || 
|-id=659 bgcolor=#d6d6d6
| 337659 ||  || — || October 11, 2001 || Palomar || NEAT || — || align=right | 3.2 km || 
|-id=660 bgcolor=#fefefe
| 337660 ||  || — || October 11, 2001 || Palomar || NEAT || MAS || align=right data-sort-value="0.79" | 790 m || 
|-id=661 bgcolor=#fefefe
| 337661 ||  || — || October 11, 2001 || Palomar || NEAT || NYS || align=right data-sort-value="0.77" | 770 m || 
|-id=662 bgcolor=#d6d6d6
| 337662 ||  || — || October 13, 2001 || Palomar || NEAT || — || align=right | 4.4 km || 
|-id=663 bgcolor=#fefefe
| 337663 ||  || — || October 13, 2001 || Socorro || LINEAR || — || align=right data-sort-value="0.85" | 850 m || 
|-id=664 bgcolor=#fefefe
| 337664 ||  || — || October 14, 2001 || Socorro || LINEAR || — || align=right data-sort-value="0.86" | 860 m || 
|-id=665 bgcolor=#d6d6d6
| 337665 ||  || — || October 14, 2001 || Socorro || LINEAR || — || align=right | 2.9 km || 
|-id=666 bgcolor=#d6d6d6
| 337666 ||  || — || October 14, 2001 || Socorro || LINEAR || EMA || align=right | 3.9 km || 
|-id=667 bgcolor=#d6d6d6
| 337667 ||  || — || October 14, 2001 || Socorro || LINEAR || — || align=right | 3.6 km || 
|-id=668 bgcolor=#fefefe
| 337668 ||  || — || August 11, 1997 || Kitt Peak || Spacewatch || — || align=right | 1.0 km || 
|-id=669 bgcolor=#d6d6d6
| 337669 ||  || — || October 14, 2001 || Socorro || LINEAR || — || align=right | 3.8 km || 
|-id=670 bgcolor=#fefefe
| 337670 ||  || — || October 14, 2001 || Socorro || LINEAR || NYS || align=right data-sort-value="0.86" | 860 m || 
|-id=671 bgcolor=#d6d6d6
| 337671 ||  || — || October 14, 2001 || Socorro || LINEAR || — || align=right | 4.2 km || 
|-id=672 bgcolor=#fefefe
| 337672 ||  || — || October 14, 2001 || Socorro || LINEAR || — || align=right | 1.2 km || 
|-id=673 bgcolor=#d6d6d6
| 337673 ||  || — || October 14, 2001 || Socorro || LINEAR || EOS || align=right | 2.3 km || 
|-id=674 bgcolor=#fefefe
| 337674 ||  || — || October 14, 2001 || Socorro || LINEAR || — || align=right | 1.5 km || 
|-id=675 bgcolor=#d6d6d6
| 337675 ||  || — || October 14, 2001 || Socorro || LINEAR || THB || align=right | 3.3 km || 
|-id=676 bgcolor=#d6d6d6
| 337676 ||  || — || October 14, 2001 || Socorro || LINEAR || — || align=right | 5.1 km || 
|-id=677 bgcolor=#d6d6d6
| 337677 ||  || — || October 11, 2001 || Socorro || LINEAR || — || align=right | 3.1 km || 
|-id=678 bgcolor=#d6d6d6
| 337678 ||  || — || October 11, 2001 || Socorro || LINEAR || — || align=right | 4.8 km || 
|-id=679 bgcolor=#fefefe
| 337679 ||  || — || October 11, 2001 || Socorro || LINEAR || PHO || align=right | 1.4 km || 
|-id=680 bgcolor=#d6d6d6
| 337680 ||  || — || October 12, 2001 || Ondřejov || Ondřejov Obs. || — || align=right | 2.4 km || 
|-id=681 bgcolor=#d6d6d6
| 337681 ||  || — || October 13, 2001 || Palomar || NEAT || — || align=right | 4.4 km || 
|-id=682 bgcolor=#d6d6d6
| 337682 ||  || — || October 14, 2001 || Kitt Peak || Spacewatch || THM || align=right | 2.4 km || 
|-id=683 bgcolor=#fefefe
| 337683 ||  || — || October 14, 2001 || Anderson Mesa || LONEOS || — || align=right | 1.1 km || 
|-id=684 bgcolor=#d6d6d6
| 337684 ||  || — || October 14, 2001 || Socorro || LINEAR || — || align=right | 3.7 km || 
|-id=685 bgcolor=#d6d6d6
| 337685 ||  || — || October 14, 2001 || Socorro || LINEAR || EOS || align=right | 2.2 km || 
|-id=686 bgcolor=#fefefe
| 337686 ||  || — || September 8, 2001 || Socorro || LINEAR || H || align=right data-sort-value="0.64" | 640 m || 
|-id=687 bgcolor=#fefefe
| 337687 ||  || — || October 15, 2001 || Palomar || NEAT || — || align=right | 1.0 km || 
|-id=688 bgcolor=#d6d6d6
| 337688 ||  || — || October 14, 2001 || Socorro || LINEAR || — || align=right | 4.7 km || 
|-id=689 bgcolor=#d6d6d6
| 337689 ||  || — || September 18, 2001 || Kitt Peak || Spacewatch || CRO || align=right | 3.2 km || 
|-id=690 bgcolor=#fefefe
| 337690 ||  || — || October 14, 2001 || Apache Point || SDSS || — || align=right data-sort-value="0.73" | 730 m || 
|-id=691 bgcolor=#d6d6d6
| 337691 ||  || — || October 14, 2001 || Apache Point || SDSS || — || align=right | 3.7 km || 
|-id=692 bgcolor=#d6d6d6
| 337692 ||  || — || October 14, 2001 || Apache Point || SDSS || — || align=right | 2.4 km || 
|-id=693 bgcolor=#d6d6d6
| 337693 ||  || — || October 14, 2001 || Apache Point || SDSS || — || align=right | 4.0 km || 
|-id=694 bgcolor=#d6d6d6
| 337694 ||  || — || October 14, 2001 || Apache Point || SDSS || — || align=right | 3.5 km || 
|-id=695 bgcolor=#d6d6d6
| 337695 ||  || — || October 14, 2001 || Apache Point || SDSS || EOS || align=right | 2.7 km || 
|-id=696 bgcolor=#d6d6d6
| 337696 ||  || — || October 14, 2001 || Apache Point || SDSS || — || align=right | 3.9 km || 
|-id=697 bgcolor=#d6d6d6
| 337697 ||  || — || October 14, 2001 || Apache Point || SDSS || — || align=right | 3.2 km || 
|-id=698 bgcolor=#fefefe
| 337698 ||  || — || October 11, 2001 || Palomar || NEAT || MAS || align=right data-sort-value="0.66" | 660 m || 
|-id=699 bgcolor=#d6d6d6
| 337699 ||  || — || October 15, 2001 || Palomar || NEAT || EUP || align=right | 3.8 km || 
|-id=700 bgcolor=#fefefe
| 337700 Korpás ||  ||  || October 10, 2001 || Palomar || NEAT || — || align=right data-sort-value="0.71" | 710 m || 
|}

337701–337800 

|-bgcolor=#d6d6d6
| 337701 ||  || — || October 11, 2001 || Palomar || NEAT || — || align=right | 2.8 km || 
|-id=702 bgcolor=#fefefe
| 337702 ||  || — || October 10, 2001 || Palomar || NEAT || — || align=right data-sort-value="0.95" | 950 m || 
|-id=703 bgcolor=#d6d6d6
| 337703 ||  || — || October 16, 2001 || Socorro || LINEAR || — || align=right | 3.4 km || 
|-id=704 bgcolor=#d6d6d6
| 337704 ||  || — || October 22, 2001 || Emerald Lane || L. Ball || — || align=right | 4.4 km || 
|-id=705 bgcolor=#fefefe
| 337705 ||  || — || October 17, 2001 || Socorro || LINEAR || — || align=right data-sort-value="0.88" | 880 m || 
|-id=706 bgcolor=#d6d6d6
| 337706 ||  || — || September 20, 2001 || Socorro || LINEAR || TIR || align=right | 3.7 km || 
|-id=707 bgcolor=#d6d6d6
| 337707 ||  || — || October 17, 2001 || Socorro || LINEAR || — || align=right | 4.5 km || 
|-id=708 bgcolor=#d6d6d6
| 337708 ||  || — || October 17, 2001 || Socorro || LINEAR || — || align=right | 6.8 km || 
|-id=709 bgcolor=#fefefe
| 337709 ||  || — || October 24, 2001 || Desert Eagle || W. K. Y. Yeung || — || align=right | 1.1 km || 
|-id=710 bgcolor=#d6d6d6
| 337710 ||  || — || October 11, 2001 || Socorro || LINEAR || — || align=right | 4.5 km || 
|-id=711 bgcolor=#d6d6d6
| 337711 ||  || — || October 17, 2001 || Socorro || LINEAR || — || align=right | 3.8 km || 
|-id=712 bgcolor=#d6d6d6
| 337712 ||  || — || October 18, 2001 || Socorro || LINEAR || — || align=right | 4.1 km || 
|-id=713 bgcolor=#fefefe
| 337713 ||  || — || October 18, 2001 || Socorro || LINEAR || — || align=right | 1.3 km || 
|-id=714 bgcolor=#fefefe
| 337714 ||  || — || October 16, 2001 || Socorro || LINEAR || — || align=right | 1.1 km || 
|-id=715 bgcolor=#fefefe
| 337715 ||  || — || October 16, 2001 || Socorro || LINEAR || — || align=right | 1.6 km || 
|-id=716 bgcolor=#fefefe
| 337716 ||  || — || October 17, 2001 || Socorro || LINEAR || — || align=right | 1.1 km || 
|-id=717 bgcolor=#d6d6d6
| 337717 ||  || — || October 17, 2001 || Socorro || LINEAR || THM || align=right | 2.9 km || 
|-id=718 bgcolor=#fefefe
| 337718 ||  || — || October 17, 2001 || Socorro || LINEAR || MAS || align=right | 1.1 km || 
|-id=719 bgcolor=#fefefe
| 337719 ||  || — || October 17, 2001 || Socorro || LINEAR || — || align=right | 1.1 km || 
|-id=720 bgcolor=#fefefe
| 337720 ||  || — || September 19, 2001 || Socorro || LINEAR || V || align=right data-sort-value="0.84" | 840 m || 
|-id=721 bgcolor=#d6d6d6
| 337721 ||  || — || October 17, 2001 || Socorro || LINEAR || TIR || align=right | 3.5 km || 
|-id=722 bgcolor=#d6d6d6
| 337722 ||  || — || October 17, 2001 || Socorro || LINEAR || — || align=right | 4.8 km || 
|-id=723 bgcolor=#fefefe
| 337723 ||  || — || October 17, 2001 || Socorro || LINEAR || — || align=right | 1.1 km || 
|-id=724 bgcolor=#fefefe
| 337724 ||  || — || October 18, 2001 || Socorro || LINEAR || — || align=right | 1.3 km || 
|-id=725 bgcolor=#d6d6d6
| 337725 ||  || — || October 17, 2001 || Socorro || LINEAR || — || align=right | 3.8 km || 
|-id=726 bgcolor=#fefefe
| 337726 ||  || — || October 17, 2001 || Socorro || LINEAR || — || align=right | 1.0 km || 
|-id=727 bgcolor=#d6d6d6
| 337727 ||  || — || October 17, 2001 || Socorro || LINEAR || — || align=right | 4.4 km || 
|-id=728 bgcolor=#fefefe
| 337728 ||  || — || October 17, 2001 || Socorro || LINEAR || — || align=right data-sort-value="0.89" | 890 m || 
|-id=729 bgcolor=#d6d6d6
| 337729 ||  || — || October 17, 2001 || Socorro || LINEAR || — || align=right | 3.5 km || 
|-id=730 bgcolor=#fefefe
| 337730 ||  || — || October 18, 2001 || Socorro || LINEAR || — || align=right | 1.2 km || 
|-id=731 bgcolor=#d6d6d6
| 337731 ||  || — || October 20, 2001 || Socorro || LINEAR || — || align=right | 2.7 km || 
|-id=732 bgcolor=#fefefe
| 337732 ||  || — || October 20, 2001 || Socorro || LINEAR || — || align=right data-sort-value="0.98" | 980 m || 
|-id=733 bgcolor=#fefefe
| 337733 ||  || — || October 20, 2001 || Socorro || LINEAR || NYS || align=right data-sort-value="0.74" | 740 m || 
|-id=734 bgcolor=#d6d6d6
| 337734 ||  || — || October 17, 2001 || Kitt Peak || Spacewatch || — || align=right | 2.5 km || 
|-id=735 bgcolor=#fefefe
| 337735 ||  || — || October 17, 2001 || Kitt Peak || Spacewatch || V || align=right data-sort-value="0.61" | 610 m || 
|-id=736 bgcolor=#d6d6d6
| 337736 ||  || — || October 20, 2001 || Haleakala || NEAT || EUP || align=right | 3.4 km || 
|-id=737 bgcolor=#d6d6d6
| 337737 ||  || — || October 17, 2001 || Socorro || LINEAR || URS || align=right | 4.7 km || 
|-id=738 bgcolor=#fefefe
| 337738 ||  || — || October 20, 2001 || Socorro || LINEAR || — || align=right | 1.2 km || 
|-id=739 bgcolor=#fefefe
| 337739 ||  || — || October 20, 2001 || Socorro || LINEAR || — || align=right data-sort-value="0.98" | 980 m || 
|-id=740 bgcolor=#d6d6d6
| 337740 ||  || — || October 20, 2001 || Socorro || LINEAR || — || align=right | 4.4 km || 
|-id=741 bgcolor=#d6d6d6
| 337741 ||  || — || October 21, 2001 || Socorro || LINEAR || — || align=right | 3.2 km || 
|-id=742 bgcolor=#fefefe
| 337742 ||  || — || October 13, 2001 || Socorro || LINEAR || CLA || align=right | 2.0 km || 
|-id=743 bgcolor=#fefefe
| 337743 ||  || — || October 17, 2001 || Socorro || LINEAR || — || align=right data-sort-value="0.87" | 870 m || 
|-id=744 bgcolor=#fefefe
| 337744 ||  || — || October 17, 2001 || Socorro || LINEAR || NYS || align=right data-sort-value="0.75" | 750 m || 
|-id=745 bgcolor=#fefefe
| 337745 ||  || — || October 17, 2001 || Socorro || LINEAR || NYS || align=right data-sort-value="0.69" | 690 m || 
|-id=746 bgcolor=#d6d6d6
| 337746 ||  || — || October 20, 2001 || Socorro || LINEAR || — || align=right | 3.7 km || 
|-id=747 bgcolor=#d6d6d6
| 337747 ||  || — || October 20, 2001 || Socorro || LINEAR || THM || align=right | 3.0 km || 
|-id=748 bgcolor=#fefefe
| 337748 ||  || — || October 20, 2001 || Socorro || LINEAR || — || align=right data-sort-value="0.89" | 890 m || 
|-id=749 bgcolor=#fefefe
| 337749 ||  || — || October 20, 2001 || Socorro || LINEAR || NYS || align=right data-sort-value="0.85" | 850 m || 
|-id=750 bgcolor=#fefefe
| 337750 ||  || — || October 20, 2001 || Socorro || LINEAR || MAS || align=right data-sort-value="0.75" | 750 m || 
|-id=751 bgcolor=#d6d6d6
| 337751 ||  || — || October 20, 2001 || Socorro || LINEAR || — || align=right | 3.4 km || 
|-id=752 bgcolor=#fefefe
| 337752 ||  || — || October 20, 2001 || Socorro || LINEAR || MAS || align=right data-sort-value="0.77" | 770 m || 
|-id=753 bgcolor=#d6d6d6
| 337753 ||  || — || October 20, 2001 || Socorro || LINEAR || — || align=right | 3.5 km || 
|-id=754 bgcolor=#d6d6d6
| 337754 ||  || — || October 20, 2001 || Socorro || LINEAR || — || align=right | 5.5 km || 
|-id=755 bgcolor=#d6d6d6
| 337755 ||  || — || October 21, 2001 || Socorro || LINEAR || — || align=right | 3.8 km || 
|-id=756 bgcolor=#d6d6d6
| 337756 ||  || — || October 22, 2001 || Socorro || LINEAR || 637 || align=right | 3.0 km || 
|-id=757 bgcolor=#d6d6d6
| 337757 ||  || — || October 22, 2001 || Socorro || LINEAR || HYG || align=right | 2.9 km || 
|-id=758 bgcolor=#d6d6d6
| 337758 ||  || — || October 22, 2001 || Palomar || NEAT || TIR || align=right | 3.6 km || 
|-id=759 bgcolor=#d6d6d6
| 337759 ||  || — || October 22, 2001 || Palomar || NEAT || — || align=right | 3.4 km || 
|-id=760 bgcolor=#fefefe
| 337760 ||  || — || October 20, 2001 || Socorro || LINEAR || — || align=right | 1.3 km || 
|-id=761 bgcolor=#C2FFFF
| 337761 ||  || — || September 21, 2001 || Socorro || LINEAR || L5 || align=right | 9.5 km || 
|-id=762 bgcolor=#d6d6d6
| 337762 ||  || — || October 20, 2001 || Socorro || LINEAR || — || align=right | 3.9 km || 
|-id=763 bgcolor=#d6d6d6
| 337763 ||  || — || October 23, 2001 || Socorro || LINEAR || — || align=right | 2.9 km || 
|-id=764 bgcolor=#d6d6d6
| 337764 ||  || — || October 23, 2001 || Socorro || LINEAR || — || align=right | 3.5 km || 
|-id=765 bgcolor=#d6d6d6
| 337765 ||  || — || October 23, 2001 || Socorro || LINEAR || TIR || align=right | 3.5 km || 
|-id=766 bgcolor=#fefefe
| 337766 ||  || — || October 23, 2001 || Socorro || LINEAR || MAS || align=right data-sort-value="0.81" | 810 m || 
|-id=767 bgcolor=#d6d6d6
| 337767 ||  || — || October 23, 2001 || Socorro || LINEAR || — || align=right | 3.5 km || 
|-id=768 bgcolor=#fefefe
| 337768 ||  || — || October 23, 2001 || Socorro || LINEAR || NYS || align=right data-sort-value="0.73" | 730 m || 
|-id=769 bgcolor=#d6d6d6
| 337769 ||  || — || October 23, 2001 || Socorro || LINEAR || — || align=right | 4.6 km || 
|-id=770 bgcolor=#d6d6d6
| 337770 ||  || — || October 23, 2001 || Socorro || LINEAR || THM || align=right | 2.6 km || 
|-id=771 bgcolor=#fefefe
| 337771 ||  || — || October 23, 2001 || Socorro || LINEAR || — || align=right | 1.0 km || 
|-id=772 bgcolor=#fefefe
| 337772 ||  || — || October 23, 2001 || Socorro || LINEAR || NYS || align=right data-sort-value="0.76" | 760 m || 
|-id=773 bgcolor=#fefefe
| 337773 ||  || — || October 17, 2001 || Palomar || NEAT || — || align=right | 1.0 km || 
|-id=774 bgcolor=#fefefe
| 337774 ||  || — || October 23, 2001 || Palomar || NEAT || — || align=right | 1.5 km || 
|-id=775 bgcolor=#C2FFFF
| 337775 ||  || — || October 20, 2001 || Kitt Peak || Spacewatch || L5 || align=right | 9.0 km || 
|-id=776 bgcolor=#d6d6d6
| 337776 ||  || — || October 18, 2001 || Palomar || NEAT || HYG || align=right | 3.4 km || 
|-id=777 bgcolor=#d6d6d6
| 337777 ||  || — || October 18, 2001 || Palomar || NEAT || — || align=right | 3.9 km || 
|-id=778 bgcolor=#d6d6d6
| 337778 ||  || — || October 18, 2001 || Palomar || NEAT || EOS || align=right | 2.6 km || 
|-id=779 bgcolor=#fefefe
| 337779 ||  || — || October 21, 2001 || Socorro || LINEAR || — || align=right | 1.3 km || 
|-id=780 bgcolor=#fefefe
| 337780 ||  || — || October 23, 2001 || Palomar || NEAT || H || align=right data-sort-value="0.89" | 890 m || 
|-id=781 bgcolor=#fefefe
| 337781 ||  || — || October 16, 2001 || Kitt Peak || Spacewatch || NYS || align=right data-sort-value="0.60" | 600 m || 
|-id=782 bgcolor=#d6d6d6
| 337782 ||  || — || October 17, 2001 || Socorro || LINEAR || — || align=right | 4.3 km || 
|-id=783 bgcolor=#d6d6d6
| 337783 ||  || — || October 18, 2001 || Socorro || LINEAR || EUP || align=right | 4.2 km || 
|-id=784 bgcolor=#d6d6d6
| 337784 ||  || — || October 18, 2001 || Socorro || LINEAR || EUP || align=right | 5.9 km || 
|-id=785 bgcolor=#d6d6d6
| 337785 ||  || — || October 18, 2001 || Socorro || LINEAR || — || align=right | 5.2 km || 
|-id=786 bgcolor=#fefefe
| 337786 ||  || — || October 18, 2001 || Palomar || NEAT || V || align=right data-sort-value="0.80" | 800 m || 
|-id=787 bgcolor=#d6d6d6
| 337787 ||  || — || October 18, 2001 || Kitt Peak || Spacewatch || — || align=right | 3.3 km || 
|-id=788 bgcolor=#C2FFFF
| 337788 ||  || — || October 19, 2001 || Palomar || NEAT || L5 || align=right | 12 km || 
|-id=789 bgcolor=#d6d6d6
| 337789 ||  || — || October 19, 2001 || Palomar || NEAT || EOS || align=right | 2.6 km || 
|-id=790 bgcolor=#d6d6d6
| 337790 ||  || — || October 19, 2001 || Palomar || NEAT || — || align=right | 4.5 km || 
|-id=791 bgcolor=#fefefe
| 337791 ||  || — || October 19, 2001 || Palomar || NEAT || NYS || align=right data-sort-value="0.72" | 720 m || 
|-id=792 bgcolor=#d6d6d6
| 337792 ||  || — || October 19, 2001 || Palomar || NEAT || — || align=right | 4.1 km || 
|-id=793 bgcolor=#fefefe
| 337793 ||  || — || October 19, 2001 || Palomar || NEAT || — || align=right | 1.5 km || 
|-id=794 bgcolor=#fefefe
| 337794 ||  || — || October 14, 2001 || Socorro || LINEAR || — || align=right | 1.1 km || 
|-id=795 bgcolor=#fefefe
| 337795 ||  || — || October 19, 2001 || Palomar || NEAT || — || align=right data-sort-value="0.81" | 810 m || 
|-id=796 bgcolor=#fefefe
| 337796 ||  || — || October 19, 2001 || Palomar || NEAT || NYS || align=right data-sort-value="0.69" | 690 m || 
|-id=797 bgcolor=#fefefe
| 337797 ||  || — || October 20, 2001 || Socorro || LINEAR || — || align=right | 1.0 km || 
|-id=798 bgcolor=#d6d6d6
| 337798 ||  || — || October 21, 2001 || Socorro || LINEAR || CRO || align=right | 3.4 km || 
|-id=799 bgcolor=#d6d6d6
| 337799 ||  || — || October 21, 2001 || Socorro || LINEAR || — || align=right | 4.5 km || 
|-id=800 bgcolor=#d6d6d6
| 337800 ||  || — || October 21, 2001 || Kitt Peak || Spacewatch || EOS || align=right | 2.6 km || 
|}

337801–337900 

|-bgcolor=#fefefe
| 337801 ||  || — || October 23, 2001 || Kitt Peak || Spacewatch || FLO || align=right data-sort-value="0.67" | 670 m || 
|-id=802 bgcolor=#fefefe
| 337802 ||  || — || October 23, 2001 || Kitt Peak || Spacewatch || MAS || align=right data-sort-value="0.74" | 740 m || 
|-id=803 bgcolor=#fefefe
| 337803 ||  || — || October 23, 2001 || Kitt Peak || Spacewatch || — || align=right | 1.2 km || 
|-id=804 bgcolor=#C2FFFF
| 337804 ||  || — || October 24, 2001 || Socorro || LINEAR || L5010 || align=right | 15 km || 
|-id=805 bgcolor=#d6d6d6
| 337805 ||  || — || October 16, 2001 || Kitt Peak || Spacewatch || THM || align=right | 2.4 km || 
|-id=806 bgcolor=#d6d6d6
| 337806 ||  || — || October 24, 2001 || Kitt Peak || Spacewatch || — || align=right | 3.9 km || 
|-id=807 bgcolor=#d6d6d6
| 337807 ||  || — || October 26, 2001 || Kitt Peak || Spacewatch || EUP || align=right | 3.5 km || 
|-id=808 bgcolor=#d6d6d6
| 337808 ||  || — || October 16, 2001 || Palomar || NEAT || EOS || align=right | 2.6 km || 
|-id=809 bgcolor=#d6d6d6
| 337809 ||  || — || October 16, 2001 || Palomar || NEAT || — || align=right | 3.3 km || 
|-id=810 bgcolor=#fefefe
| 337810 ||  || — || October 19, 2001 || Palomar || NEAT || NYS || align=right data-sort-value="0.65" | 650 m || 
|-id=811 bgcolor=#fefefe
| 337811 ||  || — || October 26, 2001 || Palomar || NEAT || NYS || align=right data-sort-value="0.82" | 820 m || 
|-id=812 bgcolor=#fefefe
| 337812 ||  || — || October 16, 2001 || Palomar || NEAT || NYS || align=right data-sort-value="0.69" | 690 m || 
|-id=813 bgcolor=#d6d6d6
| 337813 ||  || — || October 24, 2001 || Palomar || NEAT || EOS || align=right | 2.2 km || 
|-id=814 bgcolor=#d6d6d6
| 337814 ||  || — || November 10, 2001 || Emerald Lane || L. Ball || — || align=right | 2.9 km || 
|-id=815 bgcolor=#fefefe
| 337815 ||  || — || November 9, 2001 || Kitt Peak || Spacewatch || — || align=right | 1.2 km || 
|-id=816 bgcolor=#fefefe
| 337816 ||  || — || November 9, 2001 || Socorro || LINEAR || MAS || align=right data-sort-value="0.83" | 830 m || 
|-id=817 bgcolor=#d6d6d6
| 337817 ||  || — || November 9, 2001 || Socorro || LINEAR || — || align=right | 3.3 km || 
|-id=818 bgcolor=#d6d6d6
| 337818 ||  || — || November 10, 2001 || Socorro || LINEAR || — || align=right | 3.6 km || 
|-id=819 bgcolor=#d6d6d6
| 337819 ||  || — || November 10, 2001 || Socorro || LINEAR || — || align=right | 4.3 km || 
|-id=820 bgcolor=#d6d6d6
| 337820 ||  || — || November 9, 2001 || Socorro || LINEAR || — || align=right | 4.0 km || 
|-id=821 bgcolor=#d6d6d6
| 337821 ||  || — || November 9, 2001 || Socorro || LINEAR || LIX || align=right | 5.0 km || 
|-id=822 bgcolor=#d6d6d6
| 337822 ||  || — || November 9, 2001 || Socorro || LINEAR || — || align=right | 5.1 km || 
|-id=823 bgcolor=#fefefe
| 337823 ||  || — || November 9, 2001 || Socorro || LINEAR || NYS || align=right data-sort-value="0.95" | 950 m || 
|-id=824 bgcolor=#fefefe
| 337824 ||  || — || November 9, 2001 || Socorro || LINEAR || V || align=right data-sort-value="0.98" | 980 m || 
|-id=825 bgcolor=#fefefe
| 337825 ||  || — || November 9, 2001 || Socorro || LINEAR || — || align=right data-sort-value="0.97" | 970 m || 
|-id=826 bgcolor=#d6d6d6
| 337826 ||  || — || November 9, 2001 || Socorro || LINEAR || — || align=right | 5.2 km || 
|-id=827 bgcolor=#d6d6d6
| 337827 ||  || — || November 9, 2001 || Socorro || LINEAR || — || align=right | 5.8 km || 
|-id=828 bgcolor=#fefefe
| 337828 ||  || — || November 9, 2001 || Socorro || LINEAR || NYS || align=right data-sort-value="0.79" | 790 m || 
|-id=829 bgcolor=#fefefe
| 337829 ||  || — || November 9, 2001 || Socorro || LINEAR || — || align=right | 2.2 km || 
|-id=830 bgcolor=#fefefe
| 337830 ||  || — || November 10, 2001 || Socorro || LINEAR || — || align=right data-sort-value="0.92" | 920 m || 
|-id=831 bgcolor=#fefefe
| 337831 ||  || — || November 10, 2001 || Socorro || LINEAR || V || align=right | 1.2 km || 
|-id=832 bgcolor=#C2FFFF
| 337832 ||  || — || September 19, 2001 || Socorro || LINEAR || L5 || align=right | 13 km || 
|-id=833 bgcolor=#d6d6d6
| 337833 ||  || — || November 10, 2001 || Socorro || LINEAR || — || align=right | 3.5 km || 
|-id=834 bgcolor=#fefefe
| 337834 ||  || — || November 10, 2001 || Socorro || LINEAR || H || align=right data-sort-value="0.81" | 810 m || 
|-id=835 bgcolor=#d6d6d6
| 337835 ||  || — || November 10, 2001 || Socorro || LINEAR || — || align=right | 4.2 km || 
|-id=836 bgcolor=#d6d6d6
| 337836 ||  || — || November 11, 2001 || Socorro || LINEAR || EOS || align=right | 2.9 km || 
|-id=837 bgcolor=#d6d6d6
| 337837 ||  || — || November 11, 2001 || Ondřejov || P. Kušnirák || — || align=right | 5.5 km || 
|-id=838 bgcolor=#d6d6d6
| 337838 ||  || — || November 12, 2001 || Kitt Peak || Spacewatch || — || align=right | 3.6 km || 
|-id=839 bgcolor=#d6d6d6
| 337839 ||  || — || November 14, 2001 || Kitt Peak || Spacewatch || THM || align=right | 2.2 km || 
|-id=840 bgcolor=#fefefe
| 337840 ||  || — || November 15, 2001 || Kitt Peak || Spacewatch || MAS || align=right data-sort-value="0.84" | 840 m || 
|-id=841 bgcolor=#FA8072
| 337841 ||  || — || November 12, 2001 || Kitt Peak || Spacewatch || — || align=right data-sort-value="0.75" | 750 m || 
|-id=842 bgcolor=#d6d6d6
| 337842 ||  || — || November 10, 2001 || Palomar || NEAT || EUP || align=right | 4.6 km || 
|-id=843 bgcolor=#d6d6d6
| 337843 ||  || — || November 11, 2001 || Palomar || NEAT || TIR || align=right | 5.4 km || 
|-id=844 bgcolor=#d6d6d6
| 337844 ||  || — || November 11, 2001 || Socorro || LINEAR || MEL || align=right | 4.6 km || 
|-id=845 bgcolor=#fefefe
| 337845 ||  || — || November 15, 2001 || Socorro || LINEAR || PHO || align=right | 1.4 km || 
|-id=846 bgcolor=#d6d6d6
| 337846 ||  || — || November 15, 2001 || Socorro || LINEAR || THB || align=right | 4.7 km || 
|-id=847 bgcolor=#d6d6d6
| 337847 ||  || — || November 15, 2001 || Socorro || LINEAR || — || align=right | 3.6 km || 
|-id=848 bgcolor=#d6d6d6
| 337848 ||  || — || November 15, 2001 || Socorro || LINEAR || — || align=right | 6.9 km || 
|-id=849 bgcolor=#d6d6d6
| 337849 ||  || — || November 12, 2001 || Socorro || LINEAR || EOS || align=right | 3.0 km || 
|-id=850 bgcolor=#d6d6d6
| 337850 ||  || — || November 12, 2001 || Socorro || LINEAR || — || align=right | 4.4 km || 
|-id=851 bgcolor=#d6d6d6
| 337851 ||  || — || November 12, 2001 || Socorro || LINEAR || — || align=right | 4.5 km || 
|-id=852 bgcolor=#d6d6d6
| 337852 ||  || — || November 12, 2001 || Socorro || LINEAR || LIX || align=right | 4.1 km || 
|-id=853 bgcolor=#fefefe
| 337853 ||  || — || November 12, 2001 || Socorro || LINEAR || — || align=right data-sort-value="0.84" | 840 m || 
|-id=854 bgcolor=#fefefe
| 337854 ||  || — || November 12, 2001 || Socorro || LINEAR || — || align=right | 1.3 km || 
|-id=855 bgcolor=#fefefe
| 337855 ||  || — || November 12, 2001 || Socorro || LINEAR || — || align=right | 1.4 km || 
|-id=856 bgcolor=#d6d6d6
| 337856 ||  || — || November 13, 2001 || Haleakala || NEAT || — || align=right | 3.2 km || 
|-id=857 bgcolor=#fefefe
| 337857 ||  || — || November 9, 2001 || Palomar || NEAT || NYS || align=right data-sort-value="0.71" | 710 m || 
|-id=858 bgcolor=#d6d6d6
| 337858 ||  || — || November 11, 2001 || Kitt Peak || Spacewatch || — || align=right | 3.3 km || 
|-id=859 bgcolor=#d6d6d6
| 337859 ||  || — || November 11, 2001 || Apache Point || SDSS || — || align=right | 3.2 km || 
|-id=860 bgcolor=#C2FFFF
| 337860 ||  || — || November 11, 2001 || Apache Point || SDSS || L5 || align=right | 16 km || 
|-id=861 bgcolor=#fefefe
| 337861 ||  || — || November 11, 2001 || Apache Point || SDSS || — || align=right data-sort-value="0.94" | 940 m || 
|-id=862 bgcolor=#d6d6d6
| 337862 ||  || — || November 11, 2001 || Apache Point || SDSS || Tj (2.97) || align=right | 3.9 km || 
|-id=863 bgcolor=#C2FFFF
| 337863 ||  || — || November 12, 2001 || Apache Point || SDSS || L5 || align=right | 8.9 km || 
|-id=864 bgcolor=#d6d6d6
| 337864 ||  || — || November 16, 2001 || Kitt Peak || Spacewatch || — || align=right | 2.7 km || 
|-id=865 bgcolor=#d6d6d6
| 337865 ||  || — || November 17, 2001 || Socorro || LINEAR || — || align=right | 5.5 km || 
|-id=866 bgcolor=#FFC2E0
| 337866 ||  || — || November 23, 2001 || Haleakala || NEAT || AMO || align=right data-sort-value="0.65" | 650 m || 
|-id=867 bgcolor=#d6d6d6
| 337867 ||  || — || November 17, 2001 || Socorro || LINEAR || — || align=right | 3.4 km || 
|-id=868 bgcolor=#fefefe
| 337868 ||  || — || November 17, 2001 || Socorro || LINEAR || V || align=right data-sort-value="0.80" | 800 m || 
|-id=869 bgcolor=#fefefe
| 337869 ||  || — || November 17, 2001 || Socorro || LINEAR || ERI || align=right | 1.5 km || 
|-id=870 bgcolor=#d6d6d6
| 337870 ||  || — || November 17, 2001 || Socorro || LINEAR || VER || align=right | 3.7 km || 
|-id=871 bgcolor=#d6d6d6
| 337871 ||  || — || November 18, 2001 || Socorro || LINEAR || HYG || align=right | 2.9 km || 
|-id=872 bgcolor=#fefefe
| 337872 ||  || — || November 19, 2001 || Socorro || LINEAR || — || align=right data-sort-value="0.82" | 820 m || 
|-id=873 bgcolor=#fefefe
| 337873 ||  || — || November 19, 2001 || Socorro || LINEAR || MAS || align=right data-sort-value="0.75" | 750 m || 
|-id=874 bgcolor=#C2FFFF
| 337874 ||  || — || November 19, 2001 || Socorro || LINEAR || L5 || align=right | 13 km || 
|-id=875 bgcolor=#d6d6d6
| 337875 ||  || — || November 19, 2001 || Socorro || LINEAR || — || align=right | 3.2 km || 
|-id=876 bgcolor=#C2FFFF
| 337876 ||  || — || November 19, 2001 || Socorro || LINEAR || L5 || align=right | 9.5 km || 
|-id=877 bgcolor=#d6d6d6
| 337877 ||  || — || November 19, 2001 || Socorro || LINEAR || — || align=right | 4.0 km || 
|-id=878 bgcolor=#d6d6d6
| 337878 ||  || — || November 19, 2001 || Socorro || LINEAR || — || align=right | 4.8 km || 
|-id=879 bgcolor=#d6d6d6
| 337879 ||  || — || November 20, 2001 || Socorro || LINEAR || THM || align=right | 2.8 km || 
|-id=880 bgcolor=#C2FFFF
| 337880 ||  || — || November 20, 2001 || Socorro || LINEAR || L5 || align=right | 15 km || 
|-id=881 bgcolor=#d6d6d6
| 337881 ||  || — || November 20, 2001 || Socorro || LINEAR || URS || align=right | 5.3 km || 
|-id=882 bgcolor=#d6d6d6
| 337882 ||  || — || November 20, 2001 || Socorro || LINEAR || THM || align=right | 2.5 km || 
|-id=883 bgcolor=#fefefe
| 337883 ||  || — || November 20, 2001 || Socorro || LINEAR || V || align=right data-sort-value="0.82" | 820 m || 
|-id=884 bgcolor=#fefefe
| 337884 ||  || — || November 20, 2001 || Socorro || LINEAR || — || align=right data-sort-value="0.94" | 940 m || 
|-id=885 bgcolor=#fefefe
| 337885 ||  || — || November 21, 2001 || Haleakala || NEAT || — || align=right | 1.2 km || 
|-id=886 bgcolor=#d6d6d6
| 337886 ||  || — || November 20, 2001 || Kitt Peak || Spacewatch || — || align=right | 2.6 km || 
|-id=887 bgcolor=#fefefe
| 337887 ||  || — || November 18, 2001 || Kitt Peak || Spacewatch || — || align=right | 1.0 km || 
|-id=888 bgcolor=#fefefe
| 337888 ||  || — || November 18, 2001 || Haleakala || NEAT || — || align=right data-sort-value="0.95" | 950 m || 
|-id=889 bgcolor=#fefefe
| 337889 ||  || — || November 19, 2001 || Socorro || LINEAR || — || align=right data-sort-value="0.73" | 730 m || 
|-id=890 bgcolor=#fefefe
| 337890 ||  || — || November 17, 2001 || Kitt Peak || Spacewatch || V || align=right data-sort-value="0.89" | 890 m || 
|-id=891 bgcolor=#fefefe
| 337891 ||  || — || November 18, 2001 || Kitt Peak || Spacewatch || MAS || align=right data-sort-value="0.69" | 690 m || 
|-id=892 bgcolor=#fefefe
| 337892 ||  || — || November 19, 2001 || Anderson Mesa || LONEOS || NYS || align=right data-sort-value="0.79" | 790 m || 
|-id=893 bgcolor=#FA8072
| 337893 ||  || — || December 8, 2001 || Socorro || LINEAR || H || align=right | 1.7 km || 
|-id=894 bgcolor=#fefefe
| 337894 ||  || — || December 9, 2001 || Socorro || LINEAR || PHO || align=right | 1.5 km || 
|-id=895 bgcolor=#fefefe
| 337895 ||  || — || December 9, 2001 || Socorro || LINEAR || — || align=right data-sort-value="0.99" | 990 m || 
|-id=896 bgcolor=#d6d6d6
| 337896 ||  || — || December 9, 2001 || Socorro || LINEAR || URS || align=right | 4.4 km || 
|-id=897 bgcolor=#d6d6d6
| 337897 ||  || — || December 10, 2001 || Socorro || LINEAR || — || align=right | 4.4 km || 
|-id=898 bgcolor=#d6d6d6
| 337898 ||  || — || December 10, 2001 || Socorro || LINEAR || THB || align=right | 3.8 km || 
|-id=899 bgcolor=#d6d6d6
| 337899 ||  || — || December 11, 2001 || Socorro || LINEAR || — || align=right | 4.8 km || 
|-id=900 bgcolor=#d6d6d6
| 337900 ||  || — || December 11, 2001 || Socorro || LINEAR || EUP || align=right | 4.7 km || 
|}

337901–338000 

|-bgcolor=#d6d6d6
| 337901 ||  || — || December 11, 2001 || Socorro || LINEAR || — || align=right | 4.3 km || 
|-id=902 bgcolor=#d6d6d6
| 337902 ||  || — || December 11, 2001 || Socorro || LINEAR || — || align=right | 3.9 km || 
|-id=903 bgcolor=#fefefe
| 337903 ||  || — || December 11, 2001 || Socorro || LINEAR || — || align=right | 1.0 km || 
|-id=904 bgcolor=#fefefe
| 337904 ||  || — || December 11, 2001 || Socorro || LINEAR || — || align=right | 1.0 km || 
|-id=905 bgcolor=#d6d6d6
| 337905 ||  || — || December 10, 2001 || Socorro || LINEAR || — || align=right | 3.9 km || 
|-id=906 bgcolor=#fefefe
| 337906 ||  || — || December 10, 2001 || Socorro || LINEAR || NYS || align=right data-sort-value="0.57" | 570 m || 
|-id=907 bgcolor=#fefefe
| 337907 ||  || — || November 19, 2001 || Socorro || LINEAR || NYS || align=right data-sort-value="0.95" | 950 m || 
|-id=908 bgcolor=#d6d6d6
| 337908 ||  || — || December 10, 2001 || Socorro || LINEAR || HYG || align=right | 5.1 km || 
|-id=909 bgcolor=#fefefe
| 337909 ||  || — || December 10, 2001 || Socorro || LINEAR || — || align=right data-sort-value="0.89" | 890 m || 
|-id=910 bgcolor=#fefefe
| 337910 ||  || — || December 11, 2001 || Socorro || LINEAR || — || align=right data-sort-value="0.94" | 940 m || 
|-id=911 bgcolor=#fefefe
| 337911 ||  || — || December 14, 2001 || Socorro || LINEAR || NYS || align=right data-sort-value="0.74" | 740 m || 
|-id=912 bgcolor=#d6d6d6
| 337912 ||  || — || December 14, 2001 || Socorro || LINEAR || VER || align=right | 3.7 km || 
|-id=913 bgcolor=#fefefe
| 337913 ||  || — || December 14, 2001 || Socorro || LINEAR || — || align=right | 1.0 km || 
|-id=914 bgcolor=#d6d6d6
| 337914 ||  || — || December 14, 2001 || Socorro || LINEAR || THM || align=right | 2.9 km || 
|-id=915 bgcolor=#fefefe
| 337915 ||  || — || December 14, 2001 || Socorro || LINEAR || NYS || align=right data-sort-value="0.68" | 680 m || 
|-id=916 bgcolor=#d6d6d6
| 337916 ||  || — || December 14, 2001 || Socorro || LINEAR || HYG || align=right | 3.8 km || 
|-id=917 bgcolor=#d6d6d6
| 337917 ||  || — || December 14, 2001 || Socorro || LINEAR || — || align=right | 4.7 km || 
|-id=918 bgcolor=#fefefe
| 337918 ||  || — || December 14, 2001 || Socorro || LINEAR || NYS || align=right data-sort-value="0.77" | 770 m || 
|-id=919 bgcolor=#fefefe
| 337919 ||  || — || December 14, 2001 || Socorro || LINEAR || — || align=right data-sort-value="0.97" | 970 m || 
|-id=920 bgcolor=#fefefe
| 337920 ||  || — || December 11, 2001 || Socorro || LINEAR || — || align=right | 2.4 km || 
|-id=921 bgcolor=#fefefe
| 337921 ||  || — || December 15, 2001 || Socorro || LINEAR || ERI || align=right | 2.0 km || 
|-id=922 bgcolor=#fefefe
| 337922 ||  || — || December 15, 2001 || Socorro || LINEAR || — || align=right | 1.0 km || 
|-id=923 bgcolor=#d6d6d6
| 337923 ||  || — || December 15, 2001 || Socorro || LINEAR || — || align=right | 3.1 km || 
|-id=924 bgcolor=#fefefe
| 337924 ||  || — || December 15, 2001 || Socorro || LINEAR || NYS || align=right data-sort-value="0.94" | 940 m || 
|-id=925 bgcolor=#fefefe
| 337925 ||  || — || December 15, 2001 || Socorro || LINEAR || V || align=right data-sort-value="0.92" | 920 m || 
|-id=926 bgcolor=#fefefe
| 337926 ||  || — || December 14, 2001 || Socorro || LINEAR || MAS || align=right data-sort-value="0.65" | 650 m || 
|-id=927 bgcolor=#d6d6d6
| 337927 ||  || — || December 15, 2001 || Socorro || LINEAR || — || align=right | 6.1 km || 
|-id=928 bgcolor=#d6d6d6
| 337928 ||  || — || December 7, 2001 || Palomar || NEAT || — || align=right | 5.0 km || 
|-id=929 bgcolor=#d6d6d6
| 337929 ||  || — || December 15, 2001 || Socorro || LINEAR || — || align=right | 3.0 km || 
|-id=930 bgcolor=#fefefe
| 337930 ||  || — || December 17, 2001 || Goodricke-Pigott || R. A. Tucker || — || align=right data-sort-value="0.87" | 870 m || 
|-id=931 bgcolor=#d6d6d6
| 337931 ||  || — || December 17, 2001 || Socorro || LINEAR || LIX || align=right | 3.5 km || 
|-id=932 bgcolor=#fefefe
| 337932 ||  || — || December 17, 2001 || Socorro || LINEAR || — || align=right | 1.1 km || 
|-id=933 bgcolor=#fefefe
| 337933 ||  || — || December 17, 2001 || Socorro || LINEAR || — || align=right | 1.3 km || 
|-id=934 bgcolor=#fefefe
| 337934 ||  || — || December 17, 2001 || Socorro || LINEAR || NYS || align=right data-sort-value="0.84" | 840 m || 
|-id=935 bgcolor=#fefefe
| 337935 ||  || — || December 18, 2001 || Socorro || LINEAR || — || align=right data-sort-value="0.76" | 760 m || 
|-id=936 bgcolor=#fefefe
| 337936 ||  || — || December 18, 2001 || Socorro || LINEAR || NYS || align=right data-sort-value="0.76" | 760 m || 
|-id=937 bgcolor=#fefefe
| 337937 ||  || — || December 18, 2001 || Socorro || LINEAR || MAS || align=right data-sort-value="0.86" | 860 m || 
|-id=938 bgcolor=#fefefe
| 337938 ||  || — || December 18, 2001 || Socorro || LINEAR || — || align=right | 1.3 km || 
|-id=939 bgcolor=#fefefe
| 337939 ||  || — || December 18, 2001 || Socorro || LINEAR || MAS || align=right | 1.0 km || 
|-id=940 bgcolor=#fefefe
| 337940 ||  || — || December 18, 2001 || Socorro || LINEAR || ERI || align=right | 1.7 km || 
|-id=941 bgcolor=#fefefe
| 337941 ||  || — || December 18, 2001 || Socorro || LINEAR || — || align=right data-sort-value="0.91" | 910 m || 
|-id=942 bgcolor=#d6d6d6
| 337942 ||  || — || December 18, 2001 || Socorro || LINEAR || — || align=right | 4.4 km || 
|-id=943 bgcolor=#d6d6d6
| 337943 ||  || — || December 17, 2001 || Socorro || LINEAR || LIX || align=right | 4.3 km || 
|-id=944 bgcolor=#d6d6d6
| 337944 ||  || — || December 17, 2001 || Socorro || LINEAR || — || align=right | 6.6 km || 
|-id=945 bgcolor=#fefefe
| 337945 ||  || — || December 17, 2001 || Socorro || LINEAR || — || align=right | 1.2 km || 
|-id=946 bgcolor=#fefefe
| 337946 ||  || — || December 17, 2001 || Socorro || LINEAR || — || align=right | 1.0 km || 
|-id=947 bgcolor=#d6d6d6
| 337947 ||  || — || December 18, 2001 || Socorro || LINEAR || — || align=right | 4.5 km || 
|-id=948 bgcolor=#fefefe
| 337948 ||  || — || December 17, 2001 || Socorro || LINEAR || — || align=right data-sort-value="0.98" | 980 m || 
|-id=949 bgcolor=#fefefe
| 337949 ||  || — || December 20, 2001 || Palomar || NEAT || — || align=right data-sort-value="0.87" | 870 m || 
|-id=950 bgcolor=#fefefe
| 337950 ||  || — || December 23, 2001 || Kitt Peak || Spacewatch || NYS || align=right data-sort-value="0.65" | 650 m || 
|-id=951 bgcolor=#fefefe
| 337951 ||  || — || January 9, 2002 || Socorro || LINEAR || — || align=right data-sort-value="0.97" | 970 m || 
|-id=952 bgcolor=#E9E9E9
| 337952 ||  || — || January 6, 2002 || Kitt Peak || Spacewatch || — || align=right | 1.1 km || 
|-id=953 bgcolor=#fefefe
| 337953 ||  || — || January 11, 2002 || Socorro || LINEAR || — || align=right | 1.1 km || 
|-id=954 bgcolor=#fefefe
| 337954 ||  || — || January 8, 2002 || Socorro || LINEAR || NYS || align=right data-sort-value="0.75" | 750 m || 
|-id=955 bgcolor=#fefefe
| 337955 ||  || — || January 8, 2002 || Socorro || LINEAR || LCI || align=right | 1.5 km || 
|-id=956 bgcolor=#E9E9E9
| 337956 ||  || — || January 8, 2002 || Socorro || LINEAR || — || align=right | 1.3 km || 
|-id=957 bgcolor=#fefefe
| 337957 ||  || — || January 8, 2002 || Socorro || LINEAR || — || align=right | 1.3 km || 
|-id=958 bgcolor=#fefefe
| 337958 ||  || — || January 8, 2002 || Socorro || LINEAR || — || align=right | 1.1 km || 
|-id=959 bgcolor=#E9E9E9
| 337959 ||  || — || January 9, 2002 || Socorro || LINEAR || — || align=right | 2.7 km || 
|-id=960 bgcolor=#fefefe
| 337960 ||  || — || January 9, 2002 || Socorro || LINEAR || — || align=right | 1.1 km || 
|-id=961 bgcolor=#fefefe
| 337961 ||  || — || January 8, 2002 || Socorro || LINEAR || MAS || align=right data-sort-value="0.99" | 990 m || 
|-id=962 bgcolor=#E9E9E9
| 337962 ||  || — || January 13, 2002 || Socorro || LINEAR || — || align=right | 1.7 km || 
|-id=963 bgcolor=#fefefe
| 337963 ||  || — || January 9, 2002 || Campo Imperatore || CINEOS || MAS || align=right data-sort-value="0.95" | 950 m || 
|-id=964 bgcolor=#d6d6d6
| 337964 ||  || — || January 14, 2002 || Palomar || NEAT || — || align=right | 3.9 km || 
|-id=965 bgcolor=#d6d6d6
| 337965 ||  || — || January 23, 2002 || Socorro || LINEAR || THB || align=right | 4.3 km || 
|-id=966 bgcolor=#E9E9E9
| 337966 ||  || — || February 3, 2002 || Palomar || NEAT || — || align=right | 1.5 km || 
|-id=967 bgcolor=#d6d6d6
| 337967 ||  || — || February 6, 2002 || Socorro || LINEAR || THB || align=right | 3.6 km || 
|-id=968 bgcolor=#E9E9E9
| 337968 ||  || — || February 12, 2002 || Desert Eagle || W. K. Y. Yeung || — || align=right | 1.3 km || 
|-id=969 bgcolor=#fefefe
| 337969 ||  || — || February 7, 2002 || Socorro || LINEAR || — || align=right | 1.2 km || 
|-id=970 bgcolor=#fefefe
| 337970 ||  || — || February 6, 2002 || Socorro || LINEAR || V || align=right data-sort-value="0.94" | 940 m || 
|-id=971 bgcolor=#E9E9E9
| 337971 ||  || — || February 7, 2002 || Socorro || LINEAR || ADE || align=right | 4.2 km || 
|-id=972 bgcolor=#E9E9E9
| 337972 ||  || — || February 7, 2002 || Socorro || LINEAR || — || align=right | 1.2 km || 
|-id=973 bgcolor=#E9E9E9
| 337973 ||  || — || February 7, 2002 || Socorro || LINEAR || — || align=right | 1.7 km || 
|-id=974 bgcolor=#E9E9E9
| 337974 ||  || — || February 7, 2002 || Socorro || LINEAR || ADE || align=right | 3.1 km || 
|-id=975 bgcolor=#E9E9E9
| 337975 ||  || — || February 7, 2002 || Socorro || LINEAR || — || align=right | 3.7 km || 
|-id=976 bgcolor=#E9E9E9
| 337976 ||  || — || February 7, 2002 || Socorro || LINEAR || — || align=right | 3.2 km || 
|-id=977 bgcolor=#E9E9E9
| 337977 ||  || — || February 7, 2002 || Socorro || LINEAR || — || align=right | 1.6 km || 
|-id=978 bgcolor=#E9E9E9
| 337978 ||  || — || February 7, 2002 || Socorro || LINEAR || — || align=right | 1.2 km || 
|-id=979 bgcolor=#E9E9E9
| 337979 ||  || — || February 6, 2002 || Palomar || NEAT || — || align=right | 1.9 km || 
|-id=980 bgcolor=#E9E9E9
| 337980 ||  || — || January 13, 2002 || Socorro || LINEAR || — || align=right | 2.5 km || 
|-id=981 bgcolor=#E9E9E9
| 337981 ||  || — || February 8, 2002 || Socorro || LINEAR || — || align=right | 1.1 km || 
|-id=982 bgcolor=#E9E9E9
| 337982 ||  || — || February 10, 2002 || Socorro || LINEAR || — || align=right | 1.4 km || 
|-id=983 bgcolor=#fefefe
| 337983 ||  || — || February 10, 2002 || Socorro || LINEAR || — || align=right data-sort-value="0.94" | 940 m || 
|-id=984 bgcolor=#E9E9E9
| 337984 ||  || — || February 10, 2002 || Socorro || LINEAR || — || align=right | 1.0 km || 
|-id=985 bgcolor=#fefefe
| 337985 ||  || — || February 10, 2002 || Socorro || LINEAR || — || align=right data-sort-value="0.95" | 950 m || 
|-id=986 bgcolor=#E9E9E9
| 337986 ||  || — || February 10, 2002 || Socorro || LINEAR || — || align=right | 1.5 km || 
|-id=987 bgcolor=#E9E9E9
| 337987 ||  || — || February 10, 2002 || Socorro || LINEAR || — || align=right | 1.1 km || 
|-id=988 bgcolor=#E9E9E9
| 337988 ||  || — || February 10, 2002 || Socorro || LINEAR || JUN || align=right | 1.2 km || 
|-id=989 bgcolor=#E9E9E9
| 337989 ||  || — || February 11, 2002 || Socorro || LINEAR || — || align=right | 1.2 km || 
|-id=990 bgcolor=#E9E9E9
| 337990 ||  || — || February 4, 2002 || Palomar || NEAT || — || align=right | 1.4 km || 
|-id=991 bgcolor=#fefefe
| 337991 ||  || — || February 9, 2002 || Kitt Peak || Spacewatch || MAS || align=right data-sort-value="0.61" | 610 m || 
|-id=992 bgcolor=#E9E9E9
| 337992 ||  || — || February 10, 2002 || Socorro || LINEAR || — || align=right | 2.6 km || 
|-id=993 bgcolor=#d6d6d6
| 337993 ||  || — || February 19, 2002 || Socorro || LINEAR || Tj (2.96) || align=right | 5.1 km || 
|-id=994 bgcolor=#E9E9E9
| 337994 ||  || — || February 20, 2002 || Socorro || LINEAR || — || align=right | 2.1 km || 
|-id=995 bgcolor=#E9E9E9
| 337995 ||  || — || February 22, 2002 || Palomar || NEAT || — || align=right | 1.6 km || 
|-id=996 bgcolor=#E9E9E9
| 337996 ||  || — || March 14, 2002 || Desert Eagle || W. K. Y. Yeung || JUN || align=right | 1.5 km || 
|-id=997 bgcolor=#C2FFFF
| 337997 ||  || — || March 9, 2002 || Palomar || NEAT || L4 || align=right | 10 km || 
|-id=998 bgcolor=#E9E9E9
| 337998 ||  || — || March 10, 2002 || Haleakala || NEAT || BRU || align=right | 2.5 km || 
|-id=999 bgcolor=#E9E9E9
| 337999 ||  || — || March 10, 2002 || Haleakala || NEAT || — || align=right | 1.4 km || 
|-id=000 bgcolor=#E9E9E9
| 338000 ||  || — || March 9, 2002 || Socorro || LINEAR || — || align=right | 1.9 km || 
|}

References

External links 
 Discovery Circumstances: Numbered Minor Planets (335001)–(340000) (IAU Minor Planet Center)

0337